= CIRPA =

CIRPA may refer to:

- CIRPA (association), the Canadian Independent Record Production Association
- CIRPA (plant), the EPPO code of Cirsium palustre
- Cirpa, a genus of brachiopod
- CIRPA, the Citizens' Independent Review of Police Activities, founded by Peter Maloney

== See also ==
- CIRPAS
- Cipra
