= Eurocopter EC145 =

Twin-engine light utility helicopter

EC145 H145
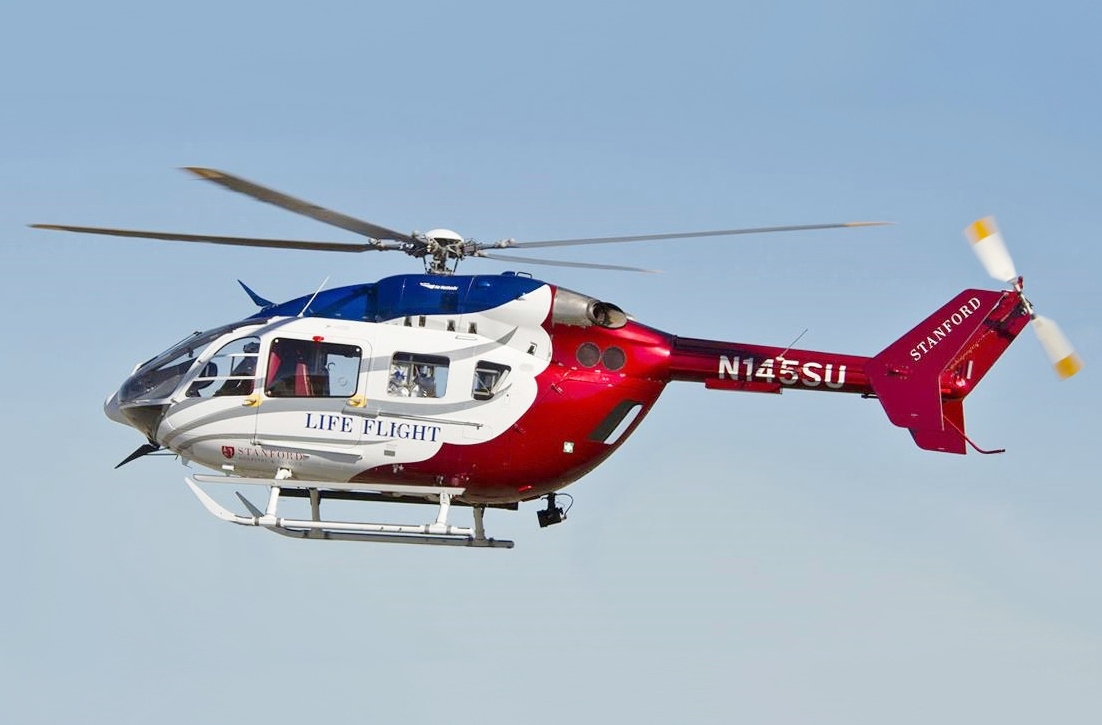
- A EC145 from the Stanford Medical Center

General information
- Type: Light utility helicopter
- National origin: Multinational
- Manufacturer: Eurocopter / Kawasaki Aerospace Company; Airbus Helicopters
- Status: In service
- Number built: 1,600 (June 2023)

History
- Manufactured: 1999–present
- Introduction date: 2002
- First flight: 12 June 1999
- Developed from: MBB/Kawasaki BK 117
- Variant: Eurocopter UH-72 Lakota

The Airbus Helicopters H145 (formerly the Eurocopter EC145) is a twin-engine light utility helicopter developed and manufactured by Airbus Helicopters. Originally designated as the BK 117, the H145 is based upon the MBB/Kawasaki BK 117 C1, which became a part of the combined Eurocopter line-up in 1992 with the merger of Messerschmitt-Bölkow-Blohm's helicopter division of Daimler-Benz into Eurocopter. The helicopter was initially named EC145; an updated version, EC145 T2, was renamed H145 in 2015. The helicopter was significantly updated in the 2020s with a fenestron replacing the traditional tail rotor, followed later by a 5-blade main rotor head.

The H145 is a twin-engine aircraft and can carry up to nine passengers along with two crew, depending on customer configuration. The helicopter is marketed for passenger transport, corporate transport, emergency medical services (EMS), search and rescue, parapublic and utility roles.

Military variants of the helicopter have also been produced under various designations, such as H145M or UH-72, and have been used for training, logistics, medical evacuation, reconnaissance, light attack, and troop-transport operations. Noted military users in terms of numbers include the United States which operates nearly 500 with National Guard, and Germany where it is used for SAR, Special Operations, and more.

== Development ==
=== Origins ===
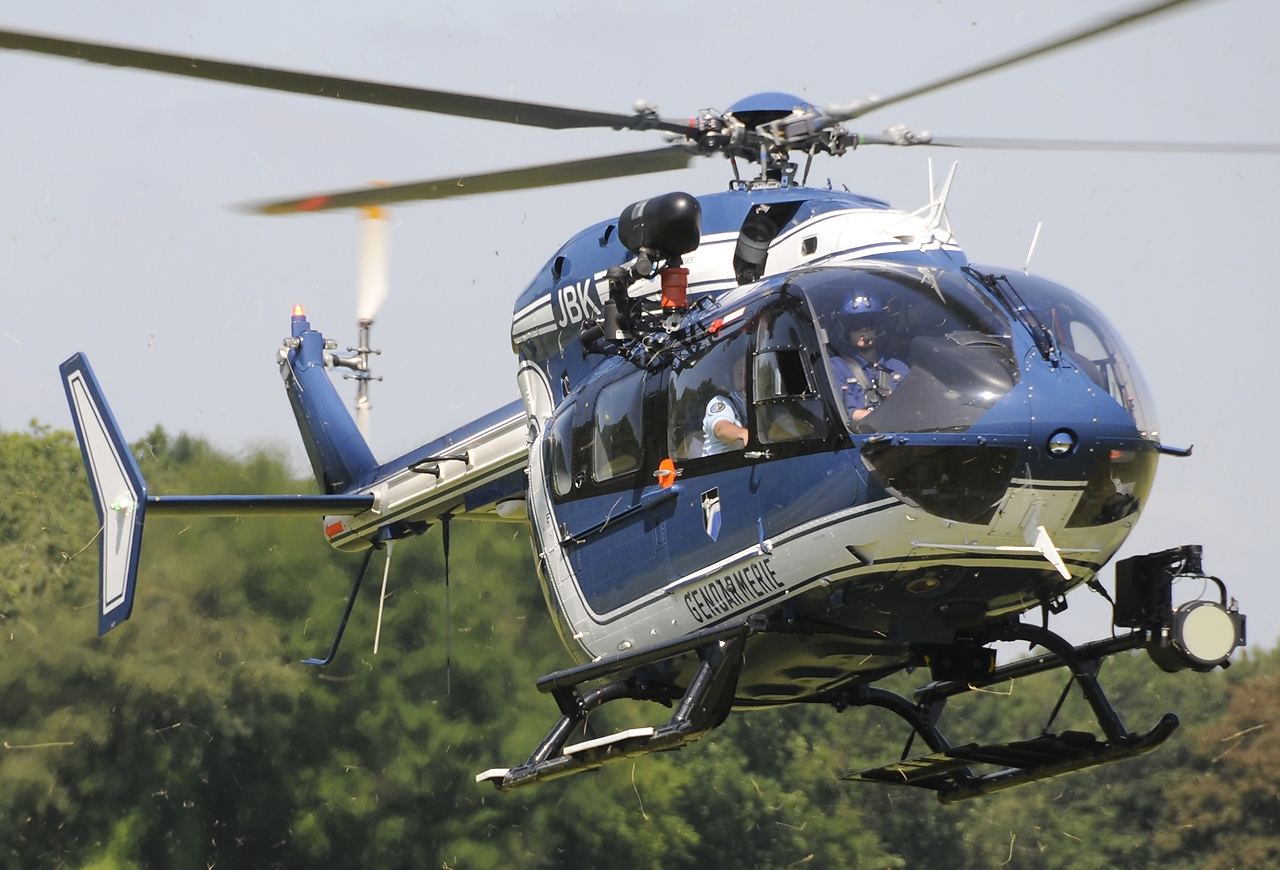
French Gendarmerie EC145, 2009

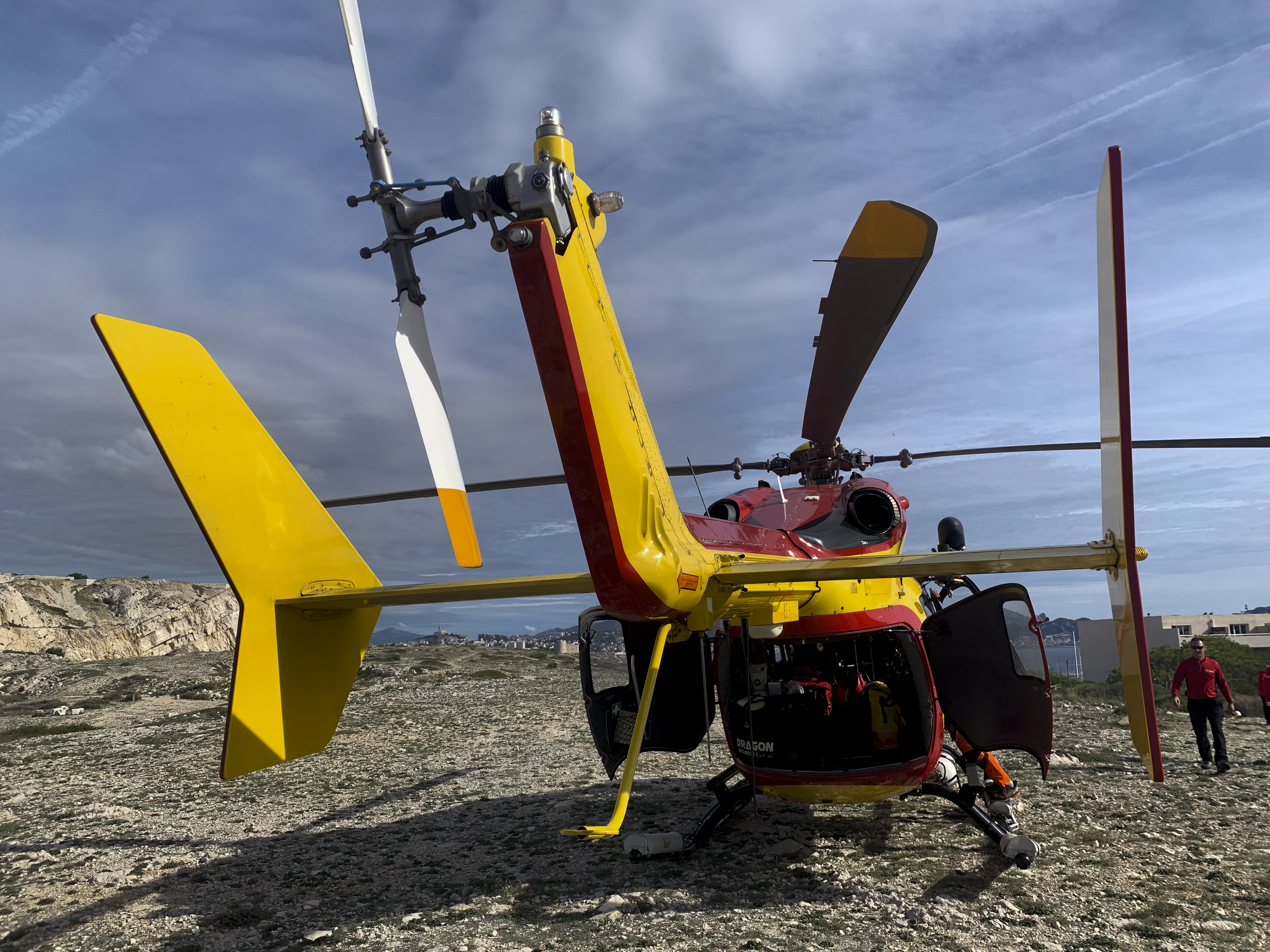
The initial version with traditional tail rotor

The EC145 was a joint development between Messerschmitt-Bölkow-Blohm, subsequently Eurocopter and Kawasaki Heavy Industries on the basis of their successful prior jointly produced BK 117 C1. Rather than pursuing an entirely clean sheet design, the forward cockpit and modern avionics of Eurocopter's EC 135 were adopted in combination with the proven BK 117's rear section; Flight International described the new helicopter, originally designed as BK 117 C2, as being "90% a combination of these two aircraft [The EC135 and BK 117 C1]". However, there were significant areas of redesign, advantages held by the EC145 over its predecessor include possessing a greater range and payload capacity, a considerably increased and uninterrupted cabin area, reduced vibration and noise emissions, and measures to simplify maintenance and minimise operational costs. The noise signature of the EC145 is reportedly 60% lower than that of the BK 117 C1.

The new model was type-certificated as the BK 117 C2; in December 1997, it was selected by the French Defense and Civil Guard for air rescue mission, 31 EC145s were ordered to replace their fleet of ageing Aérospatiale Alouette III in a deal costing $170 million. The first EC145 completed its maiden flight at Donauwörth, Germany, on 12 June 1999; Eurocopter conducted a major publicity event for the emerging type at the US Helicopter Association International Show in February 2000. Safety certification of the EC145 was awarded by the German Luftfahrt-Bundesamt and Japanese Civil Aviation Bureau in December 2000; and by the United States Federal Aviation Administration (FAA) in January 2002.

Eurocopter and Kawasaki have an agreement to independently manufacture and market the rotorcraft, while working collaboratively on development and upgrades. Eurocopter has a 60% production workshare, which includes the main and tail rotors, intermediate and tail gearboxes, control systems, cockpit and tail structure, and landing gear; Kawasaki has a 40% workshare, comprising the fuselage structure, main transmission, electrical and fuel systems. Kawasaki uses the designation BK 117 C2 for the type and sells/produces the aircraft in the Asian market; Eurocopter sells the type globally under the EC145 designation. In November 2004, with the termination of production of Mitsubishi Heavy Industries' MH2000, the BK 117 C2 became the only civil helicopter in production in Japan. In August 2010, it was announced that the partnership between Eurocopter and Kawasaki on the development and production of the EC145 had been extended until at least 2025.

=== Further development ===
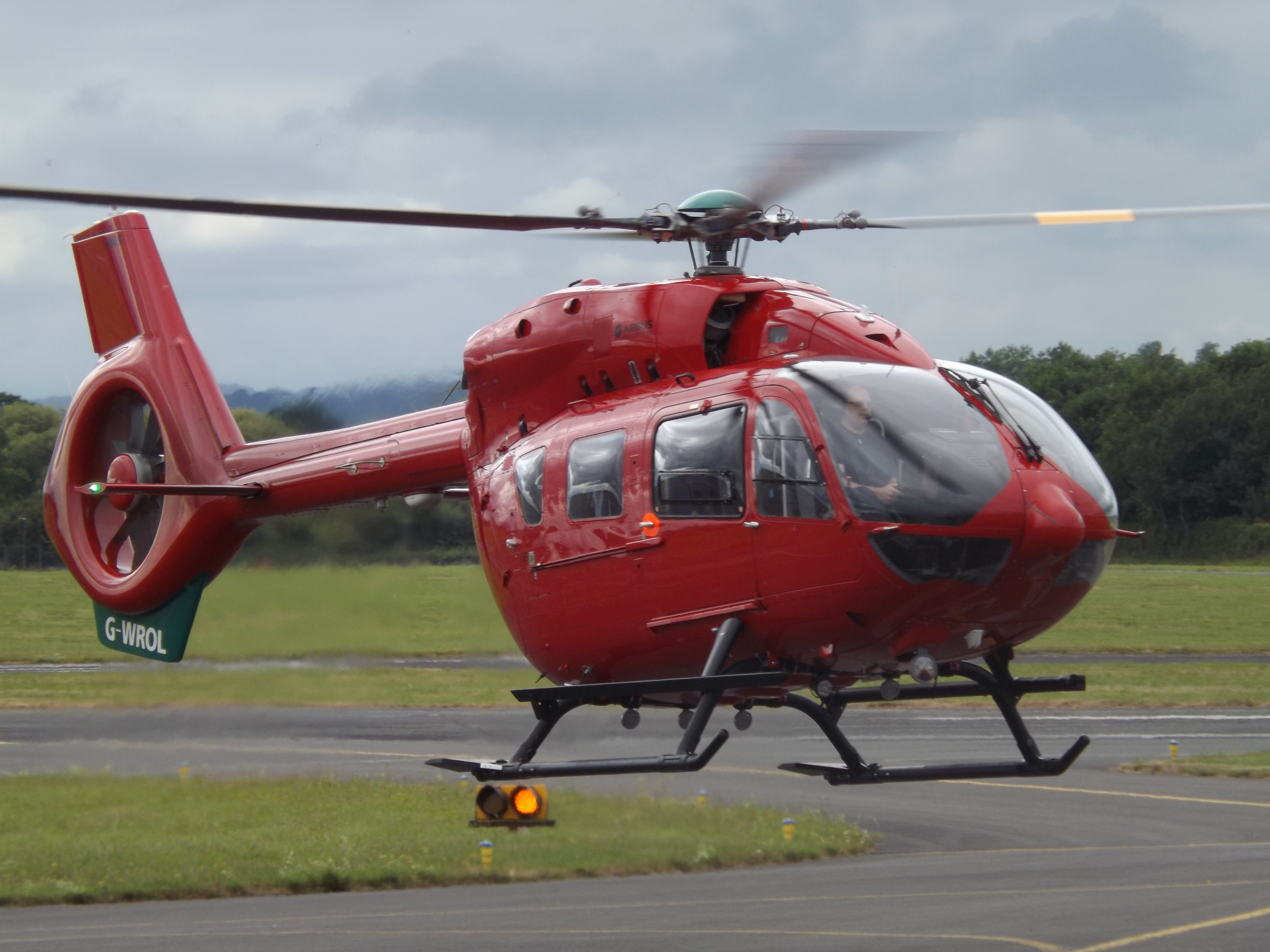
EC145 T2 with fenestron

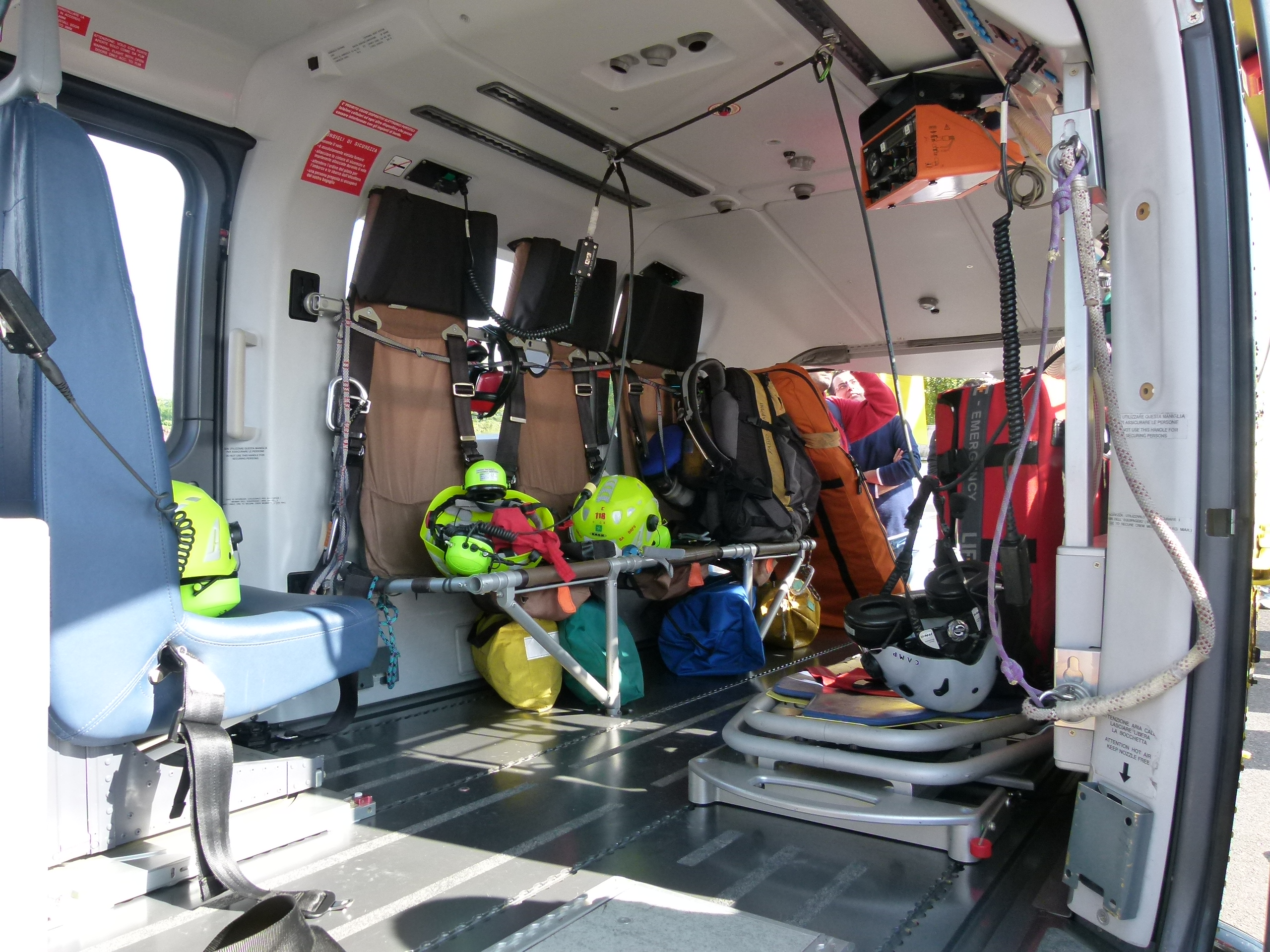
Internal view of an EC145's cabin

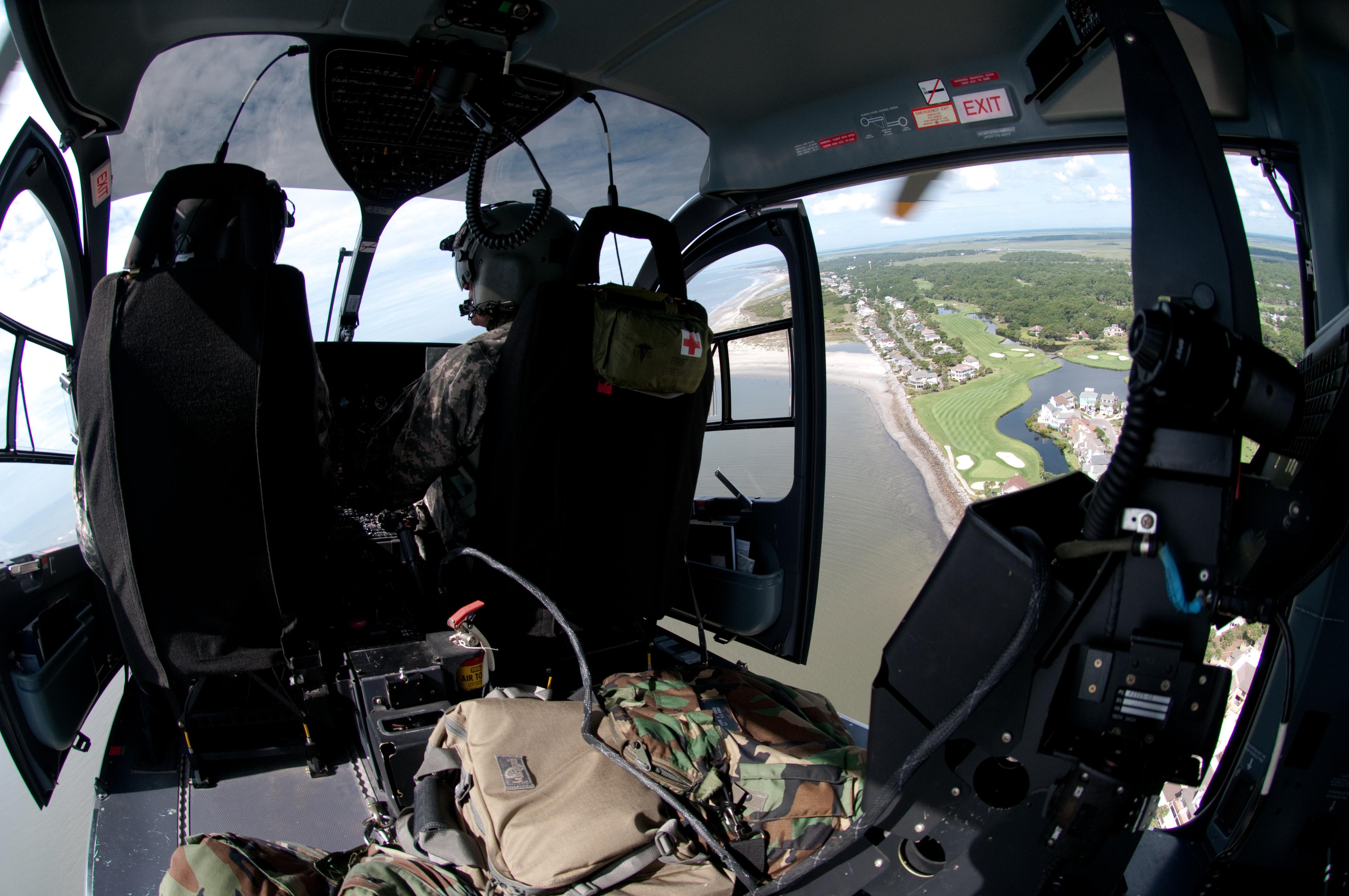
Fisheye view from cabin of a military version in flight

In 2011, Eurocopter launched an upgraded EC145 model, designated EC145 T2, unveiling the new type at Heli Expo 2011. The EC145 T2 is designed to significantly increase the aircraft's performance, featuring new Arriel 2E turboshaft engines, dual-digital Full Authority Digital Engine Controls (FADEC), Eurocopter's Fenestron shrouded tail rotor design, and upgraded tail and main rotor gear boxes. Considerable differences and improvements were introduced to the cockpit and aircraft subsystems, including the adoption of increasingly digital avionics and a fully modular approach to these systems; amongst the biggest changes is a sophisticated 4-axis autopilot. In April 2014, airworthiness certification from the European Aviation Safety Agency for the EC145 T2 was received, FAA certification followed in October 2014.

The primary manufacturing facility for the EC145 is located at Donauwörth in Germany, which is Eurocopter's second-largest site after Marignane in France. In 2014, Airbus Helicopters announced that 50 EC145 T2s would be manufactured in 2015; the production was expected to eventually rise to 70 helicopters per year.

Since 2011, Eurocopter has been developing an optionally piloted vehicle (OPV) variant of the EC145. Test flights of the EC145 OPV, including unmanned flights, began in 2013. The system, designed to plug into the EC145's existing avionics, is capable of autonomous operation or alternatively being controlled by human operators either via the cockpit or from a ground control station. The technology, which is reported to be compatible with a number of Eurocopter's range of helicopters, is intended for both civil and military applications. In an emergency situation, such as systems failure, the EC145 OPV is programmed to enter into an automated hover-to-land procedure to safely land the aircraft. In March 2015, Airbus Helicopter's Chief Technical Officer Jean-Brice Dumont stated that there were no firm plans for the EC145 OPV to proceed to production, but investment in the project was continuing.

In July 2014, Airbus Helicopter launched the EC145e, a lightened and lower cost version of the standard EC145, achieved by the removal of some avionics for autopilot and single-pilot IFR functions. Intended as a basic model for tasks such as aerial firefighting and utility work, it has been also viewed as a replacement for ageing MBB Bo 105 rotorcraft. In April 2015, the EASA issued its certification for the EC145e. In 2015, Metro Aviation entered into an arrangement with Airbus Helicopters to offer various mission-specific customisations for the EC145e and operate as a reseller for the variant. In 2015, the EC145 was rebranded as the H145 by Airbus Helicopters.

In March 2019, Airbus Helicopters announced that it was developing, in cooperation with Japanese manufacturer Kawasaki, an upgraded model of the H145. Chiefly amongst its new features were a new bearingless five-bladed main rotor that incorporates the Blue Edge rotor blade, the testing of which had commenced in April 2018. Furthermore, such changes are able to be retrofitted to existing H145s. The upgrade reportedly increases payload capacity by 150 kg (330 lb) and will be able to be retrofitted to existing H145s. EASA certification is expected in the first quarter of 2020.

==== Production ====
Over 1600 of the H145 family had been produced by June 2023.

== Design ==
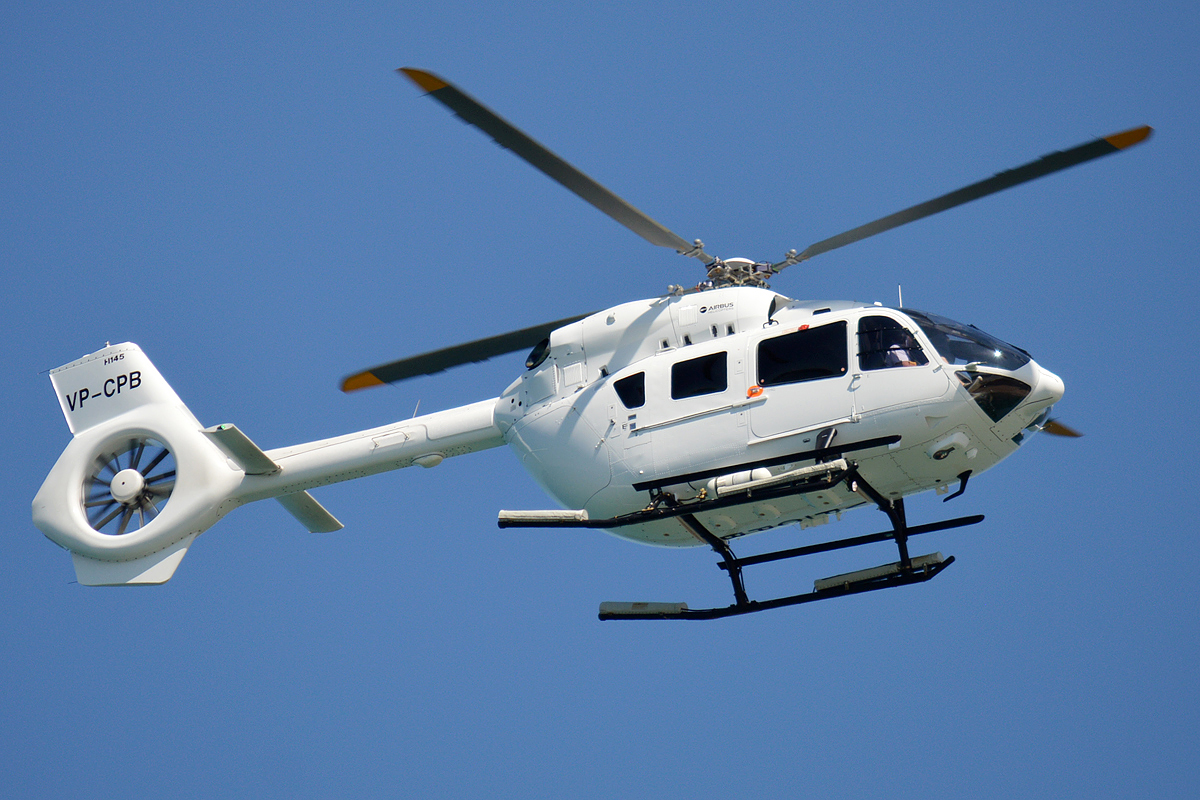
Civilian Airbus Helicopter H145

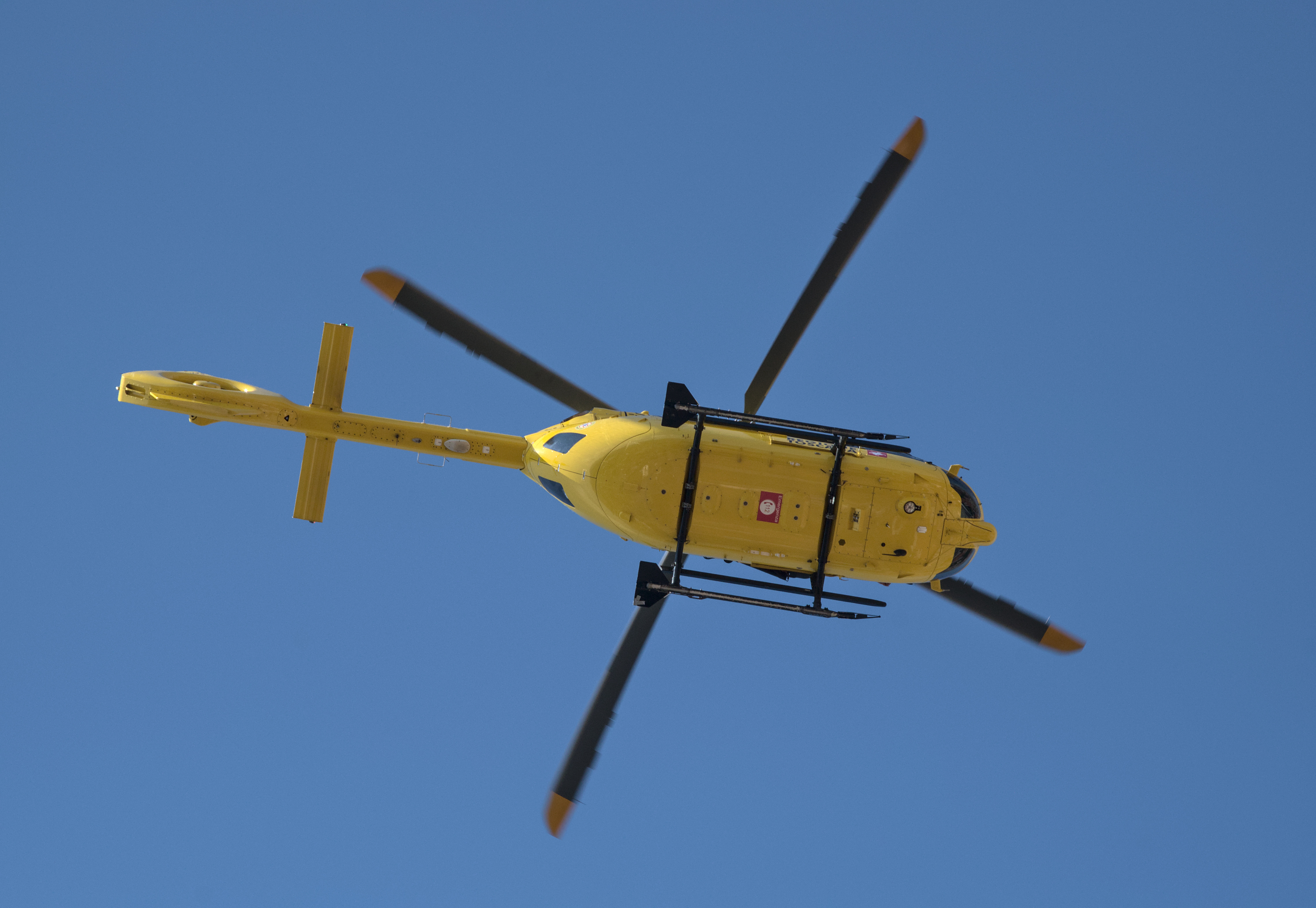
EC145 with 4-blade main rotor

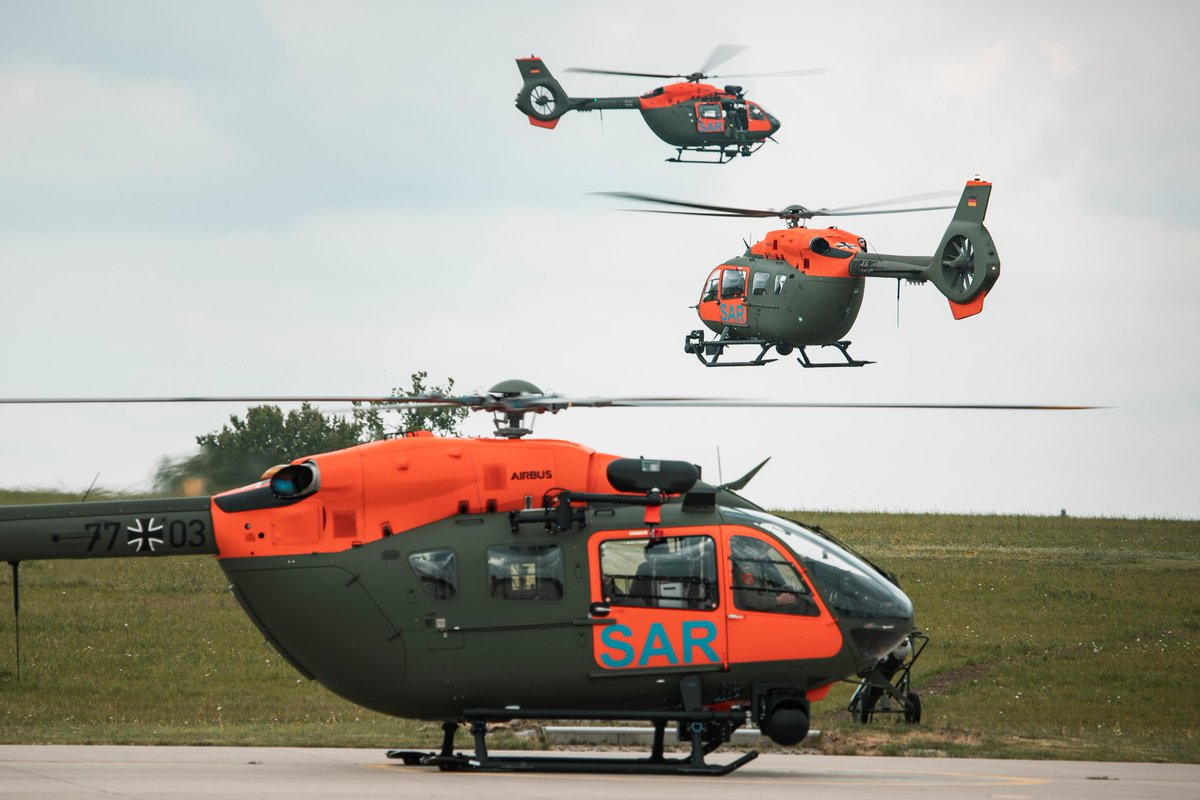
H145 on delivery to Germany for SAR

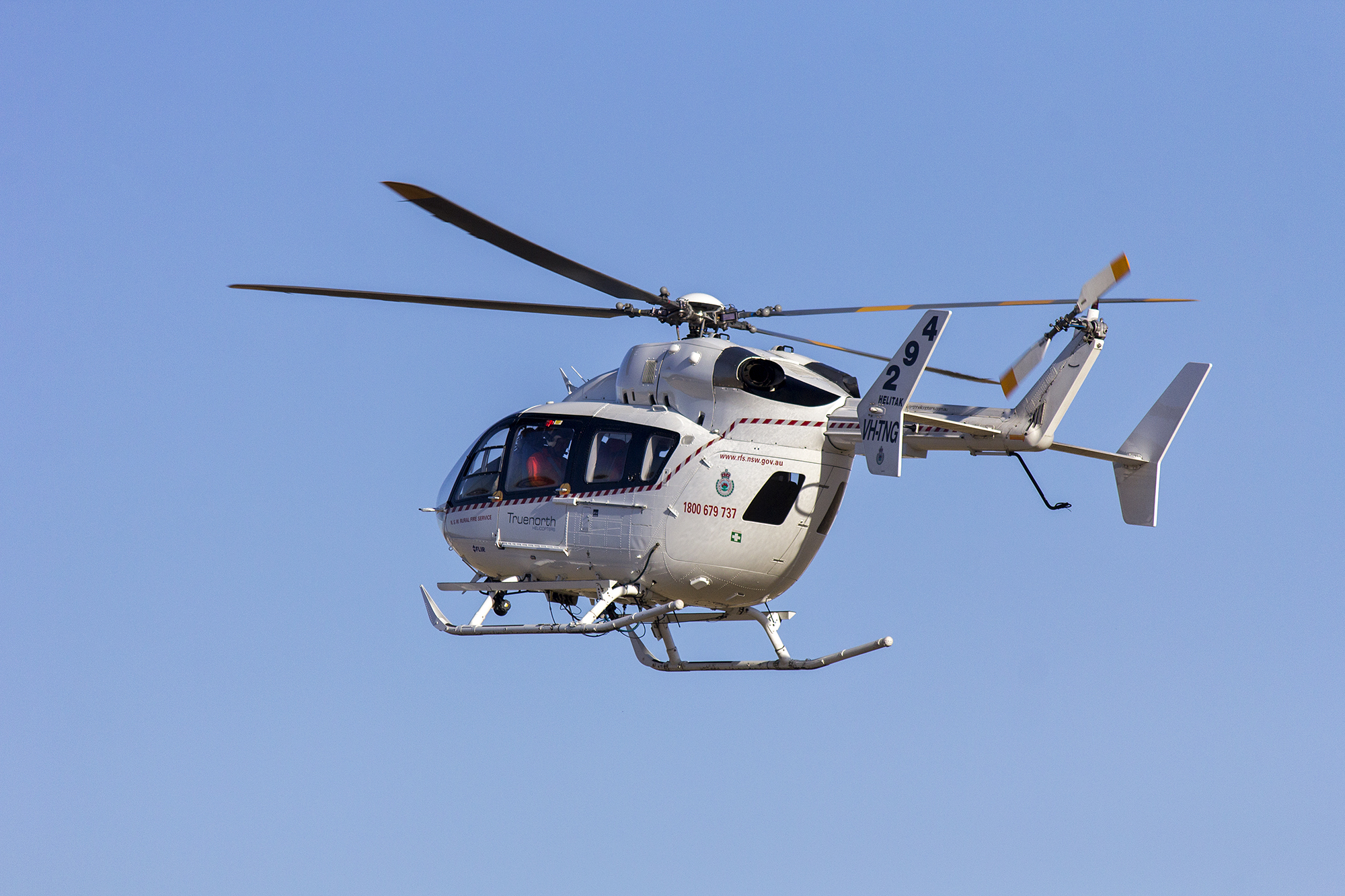
Side view of H145 C-2 version

The EC145 features a larger cabin space than the older BK 117 C1 helicopter with internal space increased by 46 cm (18 in) in length and 13 cm (5 in) in width, increasing cabin volume by 1.0 m^{3} (35 cu ft) to 6.0 m^{3} (210 cu ft). Other improvements over the BK 117 include an increased maximum take-off weight and greater range, achieved partially by the adoption of composite rotor blades, which were derived from the smaller EC135. The EC145 has a hingeless rotor system with a monolithic titanium hub; the helicopter was originally powered by a pair of Turboméca Arriel 1E2 turboshaft engines, later aircraft are powered by the upgraded Turboméca Arriel 2E engine. A key feature of the rotorcraft is the variable rotorspeed and torque matching system (VARTOMS), derived from the BK 117, which Eurocopter has attributed as making the EC145 "the quietest helicopter in its class".

The EC145 is fitted with an all-glass cockpit, consists of a Thales Avionics MEGHAS Flight Control Display System with active matrix liquid crystal displays (LCDs); it can be piloted by either one or two pilots. A number of systems are independently redundant, including the autopilot system, hydraulic boost, transmission lubrication, and some of the onboard sensors. The EC145 T2 features additional and newer avionics systems, such as a full 4-axis autopilot and dual-channel Full Authority Digital Engine Control (FADEC); three large LCD primary displays were also introduced to control these systems. The type is fully capable of Category A operations; in November 2008, an EC145 performed the first medical transport flights under instrument flight rules (IFR) in Europe; the type is able to fly entirely under GPS navigation from takeoff to final approach when required. The EC145 is also the first civil helicopter to be fitted with night vision-compatible cockpit instrumentation and lighting straight off the production line.

Typical cabin arrangements allows for eight passengers in a club seating configuration, or nine passengers in a high density seating configuration, passenger seating is designed for quick rearrangement based upon current demands. The cabin can be accessed either through sliding doors in either side of the aircraft or via large clamshell doors at the rear of the cabin; in combination with the high mounted tail boom, the clamshell doors are designed to provide safe clearance for loading and unloading activities even while the rotors are turning. In an EMS/casualty evacuation arrangement, the EC145 can carry up to two stretchered patients with three accompanying medical staff. The helicopter can be fitted with emergency floats, rescue hoist, search light, load hook and specialist equipment for other operational requirements. The EC145e, a utility variant, has a deliberately standardised interior for the purpose of minimising overall weight.

A VIP variant the Stylence was launched in 2008 for corporate and private helicopter operators which has various aesthetic and technology changes from the baseline model to provide a higher level of passenger comfort. The Stylence features a luxury interior with a variety of seating configurations, leather seats, carbon fibre inserts, carpet, optional sliding wall in rear of the cabin and optional console with cold box. In 2011, Eurocopter launched the high-end Mercedes-Benz Style VIP variant developed in association with the Mercedes-Benz Advanced Design Division. The Mercedes-Benz Style features several seating configurations for between four and eight passengers with the option of up to three multipurpose cabinets via switchable rail-mountings, three trim and upholstery levels with wooden panelling, advanced in-flight entertainment system and adjustable ambient lighting. The seats can be removed to create space for luggage with anchoring options on the floor and walls. The Mercedes-Benz Style also features external changes including a reshaped forward section and modified landing skids. In 2017, Airbus Helicopters launched the Airbus Corporate Helicopters (ACH) brand for corporate variants with two product lines for the H145 assigned the marketing name ACH145: the ACH145 Line, formerly the Stylence, and the ACH145 Editions product line, which retained the Mercedes-Benz Style name.

== Operational history ==
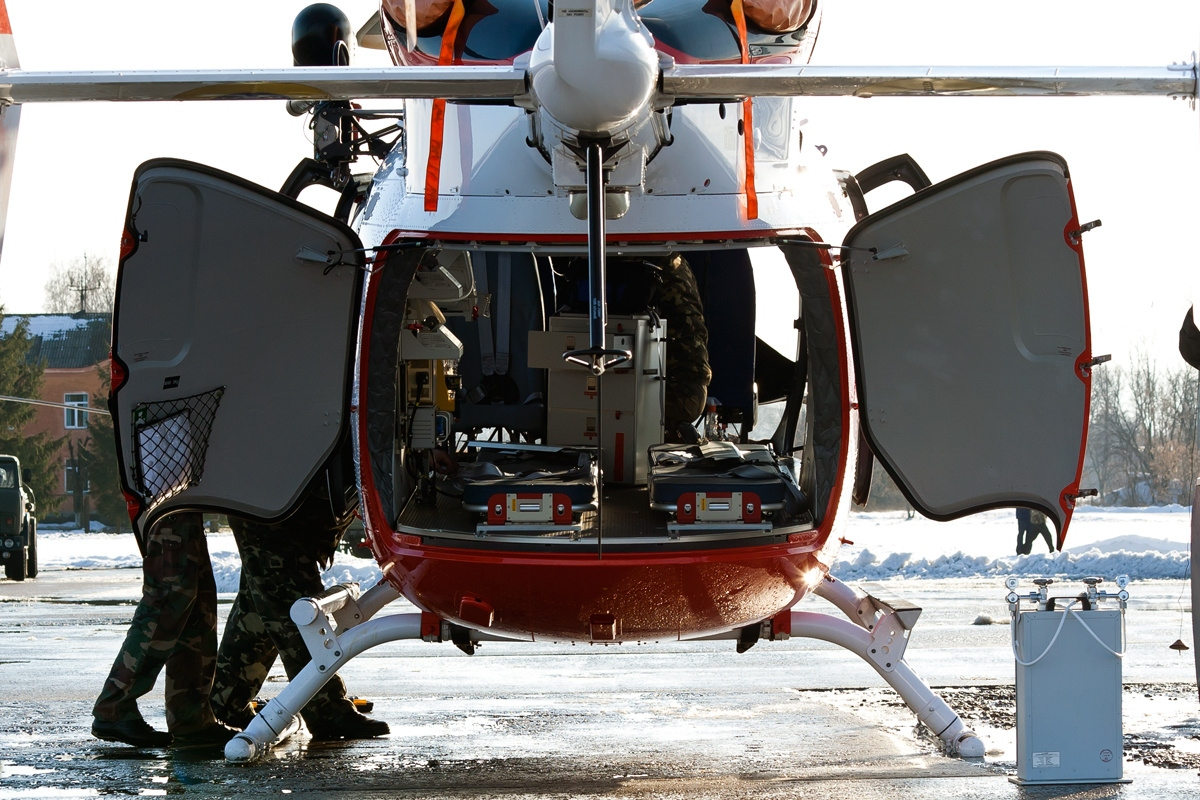
Open clamshell doors of an EC145

The French Sécurité Civile (Civil Guard), French Gendarmerie and the Landespolizei (State Police) of Hesse, Germany became the first operators of the EC145 upon receipt of the initial deliveries in April 2002. The Sécurité Civile procured the type as a replacement for its ageing Aérospatiale Alouette III fleet, winning out against the Eurocopter AS365 Dauphin. In November 2006, the Sécurité Civile were planning to make greater use of the EC145's IFR capabilities for operations within bad weather and at night time. In 2008, the Gendarmerie reportedly stated that the EC145 has a per aircraft availability rate of roughly 90 per cent. Out of a total of 32 EC145s delivered to the Sécurité Civile, three had been lost in accidents by June 2009.

In October 2010, an agreement to establish a joint venture between Eurocopter and Kazakhstan Engineering, Eurocopter Kazakhstan Engineering, was formally signed; the joint venture created the only EC145 manufacturer in the Commonwealth of Independent States (CIS), which possesses exclusive rights to supply the type to Mongolia, Uzbekistan, Tajikistan, Kyrgyzstan, Belarus, and Azerbaijan. In November 2011, Kazakhstan took delivery of the first of an initial batch of six EC145 ordered. In September 2012, Eurocopter Kazakhstan received its first EC145 assembly kits at its newly established facility in Astana; up to 10 EC145s per year are to be built at the facility. By November 2015, a total of 20 rotorcraft had been produced at the Kazakhstan facility, 14 for the Ministry of Emergencies of Kazakhstan and 6 for the Ministry of Defense of Kazakhstan.

In April 2012, Eurocopter announced that the 500th EC145 had been delivered. On 31 July 2014, the first EC145 T2, an updated variant, was delivered to its launch customer, DRF Luftrettung, who have ordered a total of 20 such helicopters for emergency medical service operations.

In April 2015, Airbus Group Australia Pacific delivered its first H145, previously designated as the EC145 T2. In June 2015, it was announced that Saudi Arabia intended to purchase 23 H145s worth $500 million. In November 2015, it was reported that the H145 had attained an average availability rate of 94%.

On 25 September 2019 an Airbus H145 landed on the summit of Aconcagua, highest mountain in Southern Hemisphere at 6962 metres (22,840 ft), crewed by Airbus experimental test pilot Alexander Neuhaus and flight test engineer Antoine van Gent. This is a record for a twin-engined helicopter.

=== Military ===
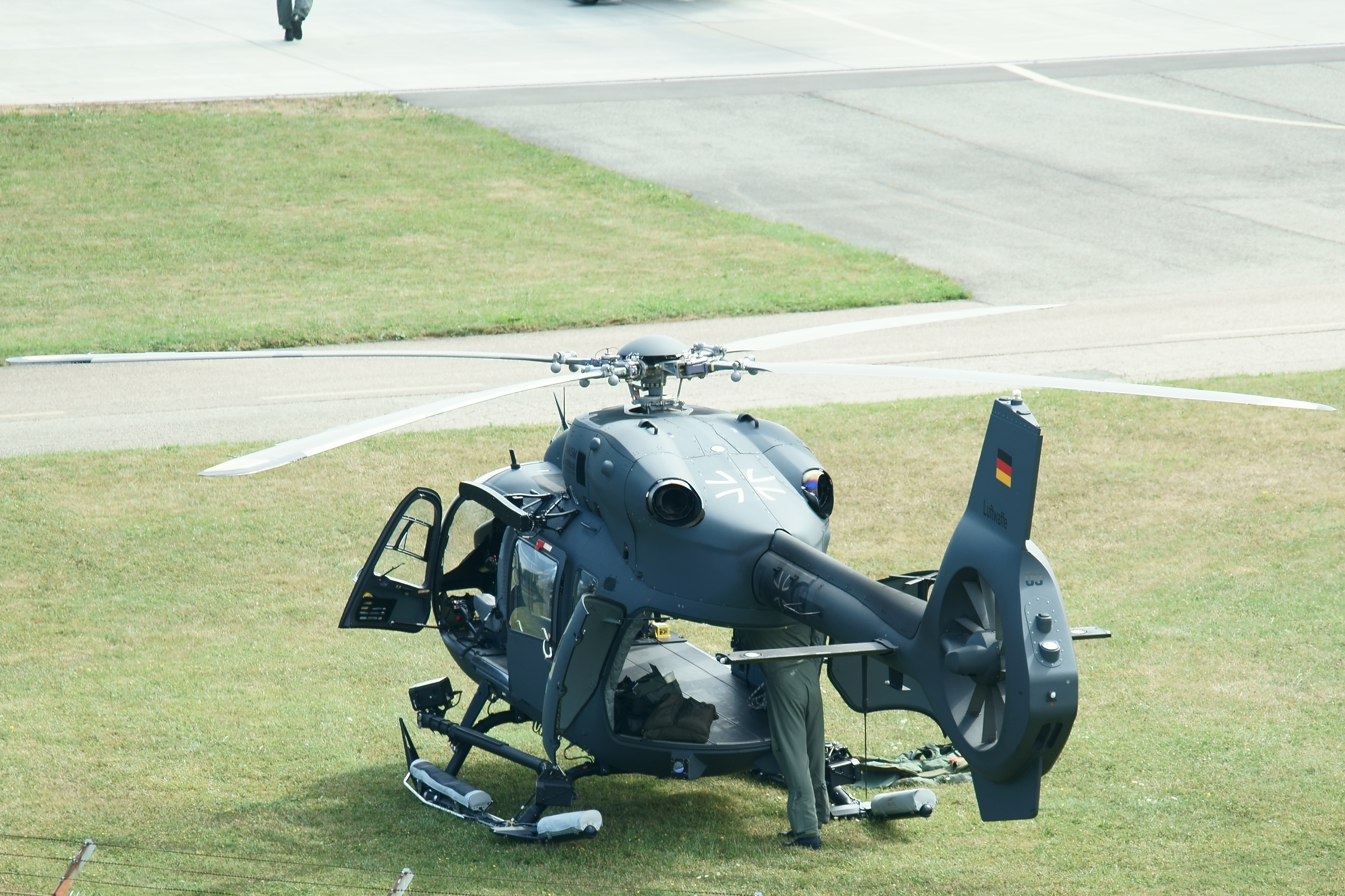
German military version of the H145 for special operations (KSK)

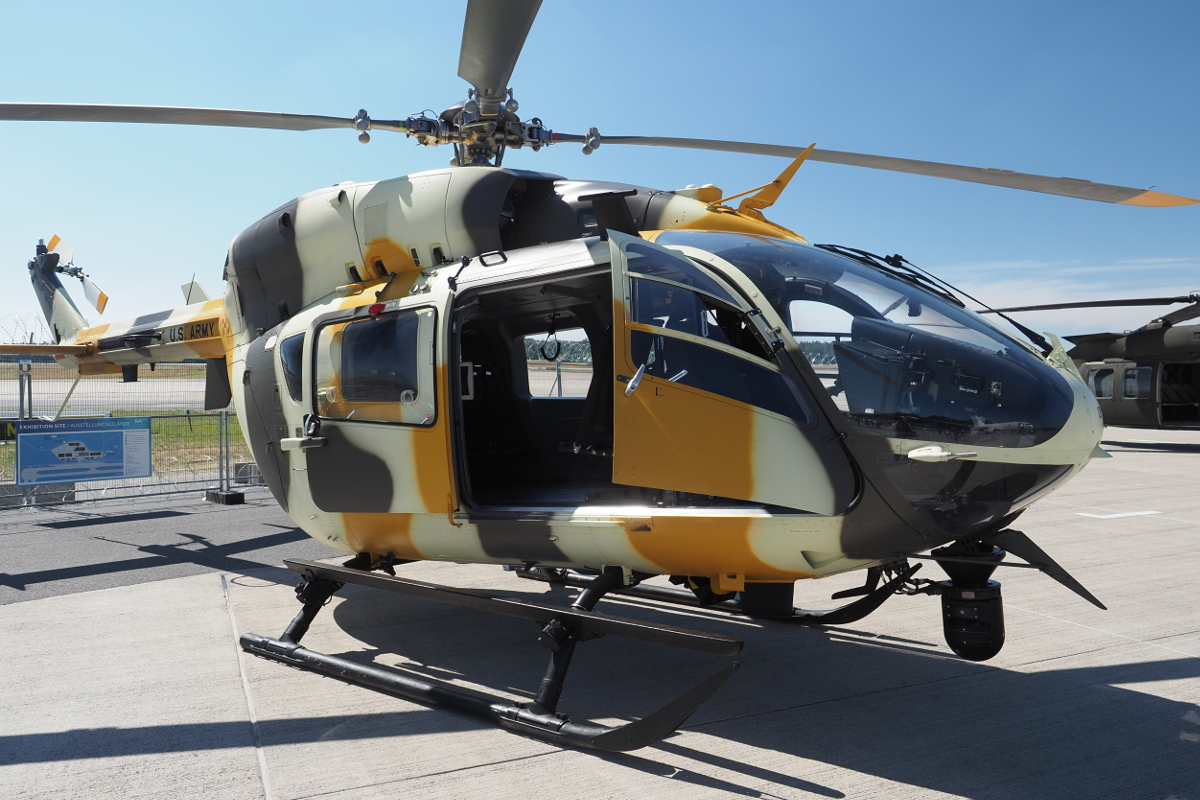
Airbus UH-72A on display at the ILA 2022 Air Show

In 2006, the UH-145, a military variant of the EC145, was selected for the United States Army's Light Utility Helicopter Program, beating three other helicopters. The deal, valued at $3 billion, involved the supply and servicing of 345 helicopters, with options for additional aircraft. The variant was designated UH-72 Lakota by the US Department of Defense; the first UH-72A was delivered to the US Army in December 2006. In August 2007, the FAA authorised the commencement of production of both UH-72A and civil EC145 rotorcraft at American Eurocopter's facility in Columbus, Mississippi.

In July 2013, Germany purchased 15 EC145s for the German Army to be used for special operations (KSK) designated EC645 T2. The EC645 T2 is armed with weapon mounts, fitted with electronic countermeasures system, ballistic protection, electro-optical system, fast rope system, cargo hooks and hoists. In October 2014, Thailand placed an order for 5 EC645 T2s for the Royal Thai Navy. On 27 November 2014, the maiden flight of the EC645 T2 was performed at Donauwörth, Germany. On 15 May 2015, the H145M, previously designated as EC645 T2, received EASA airworthiness certification. The first two H145Ms were received by Germany and assigned to the Air Force in December 2015.

In December 2016, Serbia placed an order for nine H145Ms with six for the Serbian Air Force and Air Defence, four of the six to be equipped with the HForce weapon system, and three for the Police of Serbia. In November 2018, Serbia changed the distribution of the H145Ms; the Police to receive an additional H145M and the Serbian Air Force and Air Defence to receive one less H145M with three equipped with HForce. In November 2017, Airbus completed the first test fire of the HForce modular weapon system. HForce will enable the H145M hardpoints to be armed with the M3P .50-caliber machine gun, M621 20mm automatic cannon and FZ231 70mm rocket launcher and will equip the H145M with a Wescam MX-15 electro-optical targeting system and Scorpion helmet mounted sight display. In December 2017, Airbus successfully launched FZ275 70mm semi-active laser guided rockets.

In June 2018, an order was placed for 20 H145Ms by Hungary for the Hungarian Air Force equipped with HForce weapon system. All delivered by the end of 2021. First live firing exercise was held in September 2021 using 20 mm cannon pods.

In July 2018, an order was placed by Luxembourg for 2 H145Ms for the Luxembourg Army that will be dual role for use by the Luxembourg Police.

In August 2021, the German Air Force deployed two H145Ms to Hamid Karzai International Airport to assist in evacuation operations in the aftermath of the fall of Kabul.

On 24 February 2023, Belgian newspaper, De Morgen, has noted that the Belgian Air Component has selected the H145M as its new light utility helicopter. A government approval for an order for 15 aircraft is expected to be finalised on 10 March 2023, during a defence commission meeting. these will replace the 4 NH90-TTH and the last remaining Agusta A109BAi's in BAF service.

== Variants ==
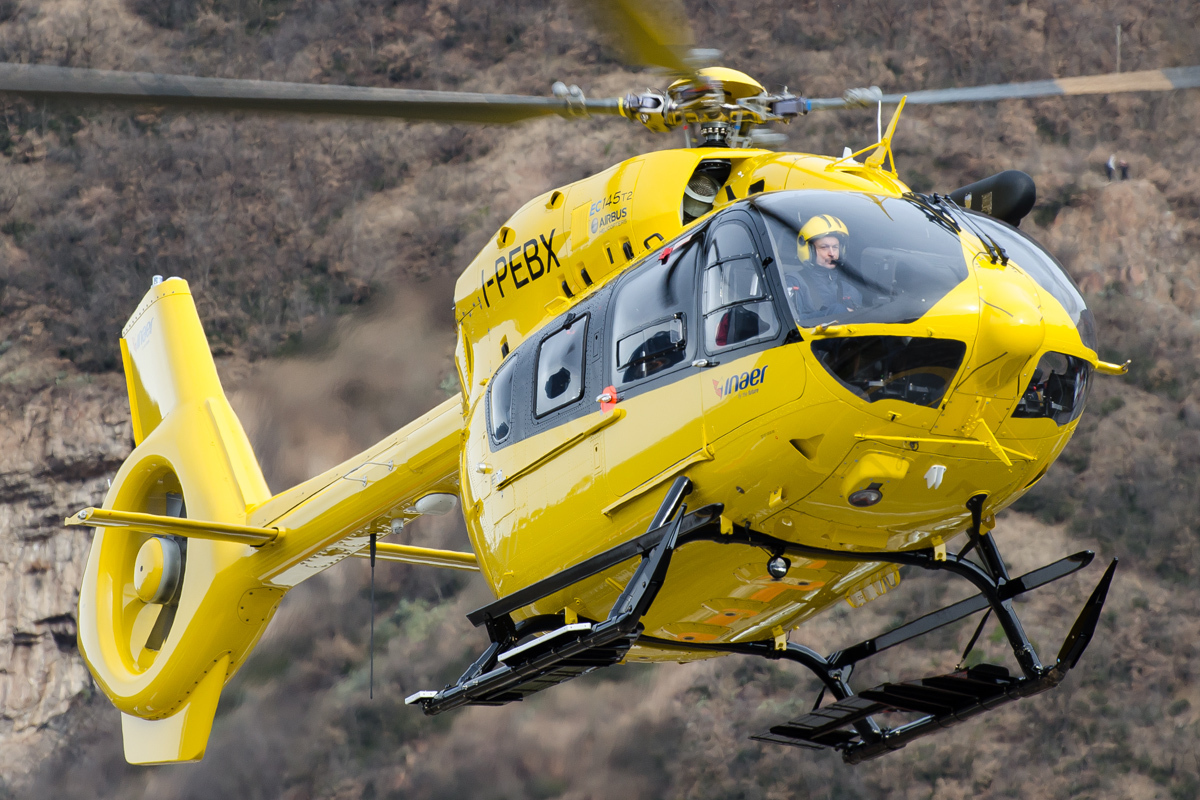
An H145 (EC145 T2).

EC145
Basic model introduced, derived from preceding 'BK 117 C-1'; this variant is powered by Turbomeca Arriel 1E2 turboshaft engines, and has a conventional high-boom open tail rotor. EC145 is the Eurocopter / Airbus Helicopters marketing name for the 'BK 117 C-2'.

ACH145
Corporate model by Airbus Corporate Helicopters offered in two product lines: the ACH Line, formerly the Stylence; and the Mercedes-Benz Style, part of the ACH Editions product line. The ACH145 interior options include upgraded luxury seating configurations, upholstery, trim, lighting, carpet, and storage. The Mercedes-Benz Style airframe has a redesigned nose and modified skids.
EC145e
Variant of the base EC145 for utility purposes, featuring new Garmin G500H digital cockpit and the removal of some elements such as the automatic flight control system, along with the adoption of a standardised interior, for weight reduction purposes. EC145e is a marketing name for the 'BK 117 C-2e'.

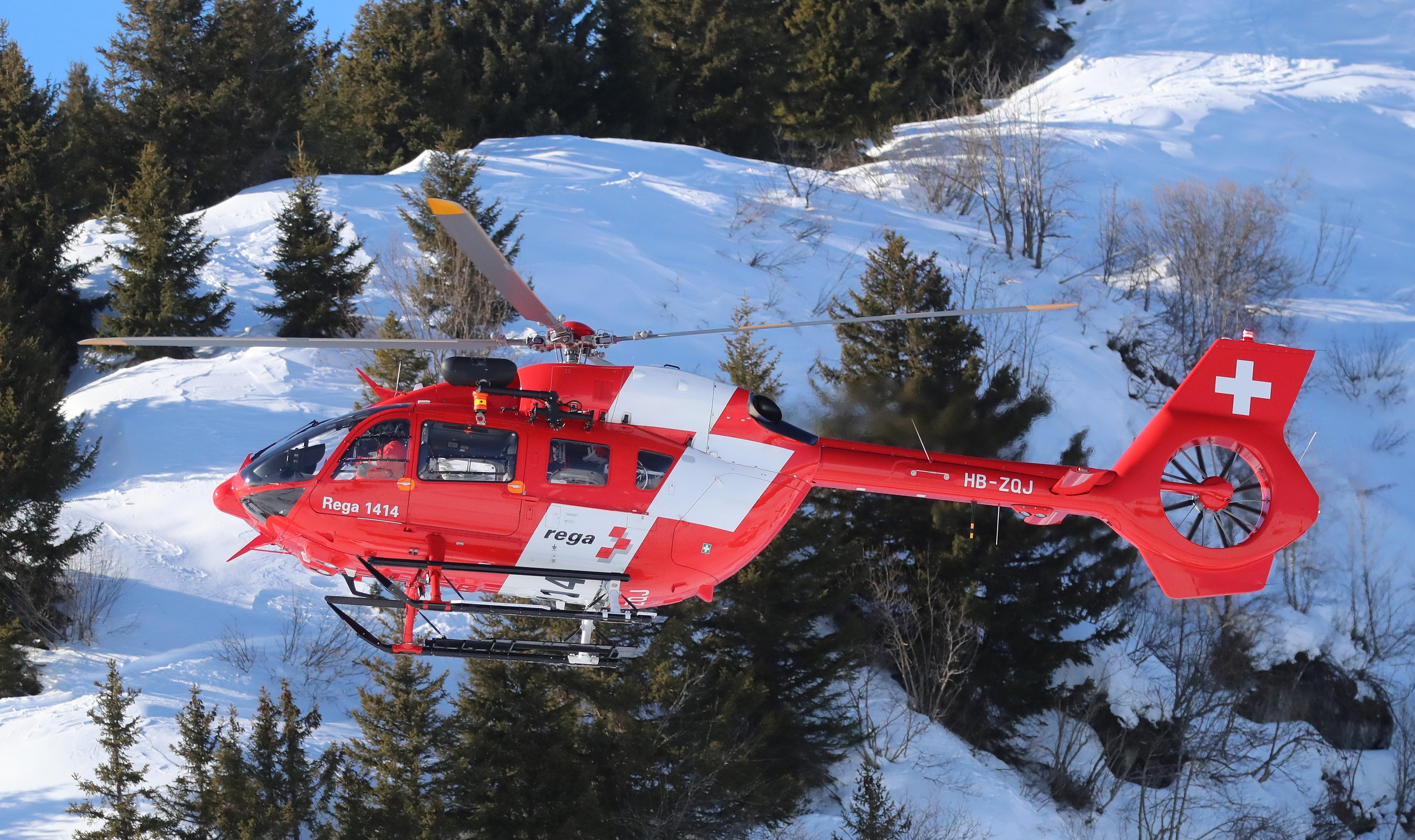
HB-ZQJ (H145) used by Rega in 2020.

H145
Updated version of EC145, initially designated as EC145 T2. Features a fenestron shrouded tail rotor rather than a conventional open tail rotor. Other changes include the installation of more powerful 775 kilowatts (1,039 shaft horsepower) Arriel 2E engines, and various new avionics; it has a maximum take-off weight of 3,700 kilograms (8,200 pounds). In 2019, Airbus Helicopters announced a new variant of the type with a newly designed five-blade bearingless main rotor system, increasing useful load by 150 kilograms (330 pounds) and max takeoff weight to 3,800 kilograms (8,400 pounds); it achieved EASA certification in June 2020. Airbus expects to deliver the last production H145 with the standard four-blade rotor in February 2021, after which the production line will only assemble the new five-blade type; the four-bladed H145s already in service can also be retro-fitted to the new five-blade standard. H145 is a marketing name for both the 'BK 117 D-2' (4-blade main rotor variant) and 'BK 117 D-3' (5-blade main rotor variant).

H145 D3
Updated Version of the H145 with five-blade main rotor. In comparison to the D-2, the effective loading weight of the D-3 is increased by 150 kilograms (330 pounds) due to a 100 kilograms (220 pounds) increase in the maximum total weight and a 50 kilograms (110 pounds) decrease in the aircraft weight. Note that 'D3' is an internal designation only, the marketing name is still H145.

Airbus H145-M Helicopter of the Cyprus National Guard

H145M
Militarised version of the H145; briefly designated as EC645 T2. It can be fitted with ballistic protection, self-sealing fuel tanks, electro optical / infrared sensor, retractable pintle-mounted 7.62 mm FN MAG machine guns or M134 miniguns, military-grade communications and navigational systems, and an electronic warfare self-protection system. The H145M's HForce weapon system can precisely aim 12.7 mm and 20 mm gun pods and 70 mm guided and unguided rockets. Anti-armour capability will be provided by integrating SPIKE ER2 missile to the helicopter's armament.
U145
Planned unmanned variant of the H145 developed by Airbus Helicopters. It has no physical cockpit, with the entire cabin serving as cargo bay. In addition to the existing rear clamshell door, it has nose door with folding ramp in the front. The U145 could be utilised for civilian and military purposes.
UH-72A Lakota
A militarised light utility helicopter based on the basic EC145 model; operated by the US Army.
UH-72B
The UH-72B includes many upgrades of the updated H145, such as an upgraded cockpit, five-blade rotor, and fenestron.
UH-72B Unmanned Logistics Connector
A proposed unmanned variant of the UH-72B for the United States Marine Corps and United States Army. It would provide autonomous logistical support for Expeditionary Advanced Base Operations for the USMC, and contested airspace for the Army. If the USMC selects it, it could be in service by the late 2020s.
AAS-72X
An armed scout and multi-role version of the UH-72A offered in the US Army's Armed Aerial Scout OH-58D replacement programme, offered by EADS and Lockheed Martin until AAS was cancelled. The AAS-72X had two external hardpoints and turret mounted visions system among other features, and was C-17 transportable
AAS-72X+
An armed military version of the Eurocopter EC145 T2 was also proposed for the Armed Aerial Scout programme, building on the features of the X model. However, the X+ was equipped with more powerful engines with an extra 200 shaft horsepower (150 kilowatts) each, a fenestron shrouded tail rotor, and a fully digital glass cockpit.
Jupiter HT1

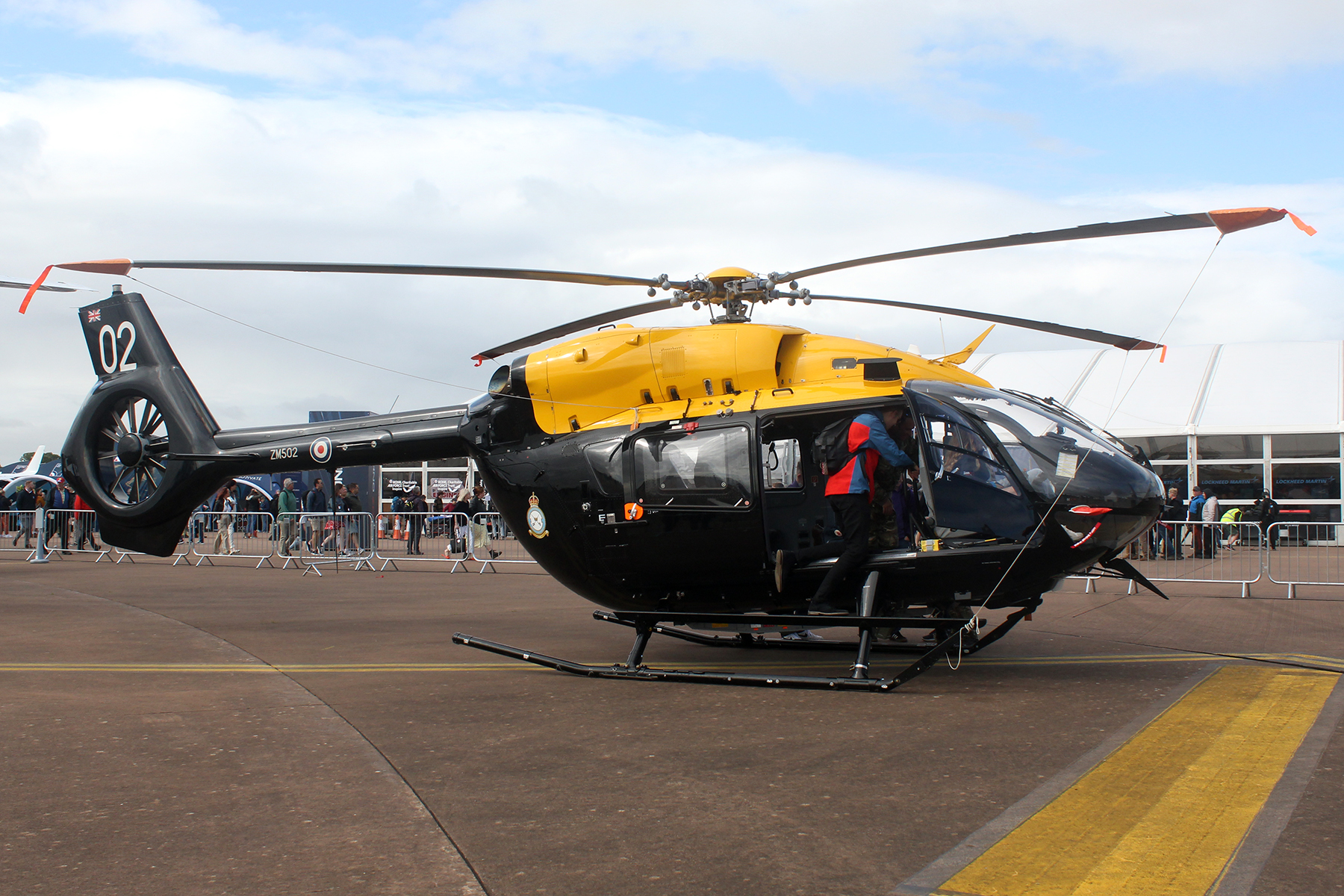
Jupiter HT1 of the Defence Helicopter Flying School at the Royal International Air Tattoo in 2023.

Used by the British Armed Forces to train search and rescue pilots.
Jupiter HC2
Ordered by the Royal Air Force to use as utility and rescue helicopter in Brunei Darussalam and Cyprus.

== Production ==
By 2017, more than 1300 EC145s were in service around the world. In 2012 was reported as in use by 34 countries and around 100 customers. By 2023 this had risen to 1600. In 2024 the Airbus site listed nearly 1700 of this family produced, including the early BK 117.

== Military operators ==
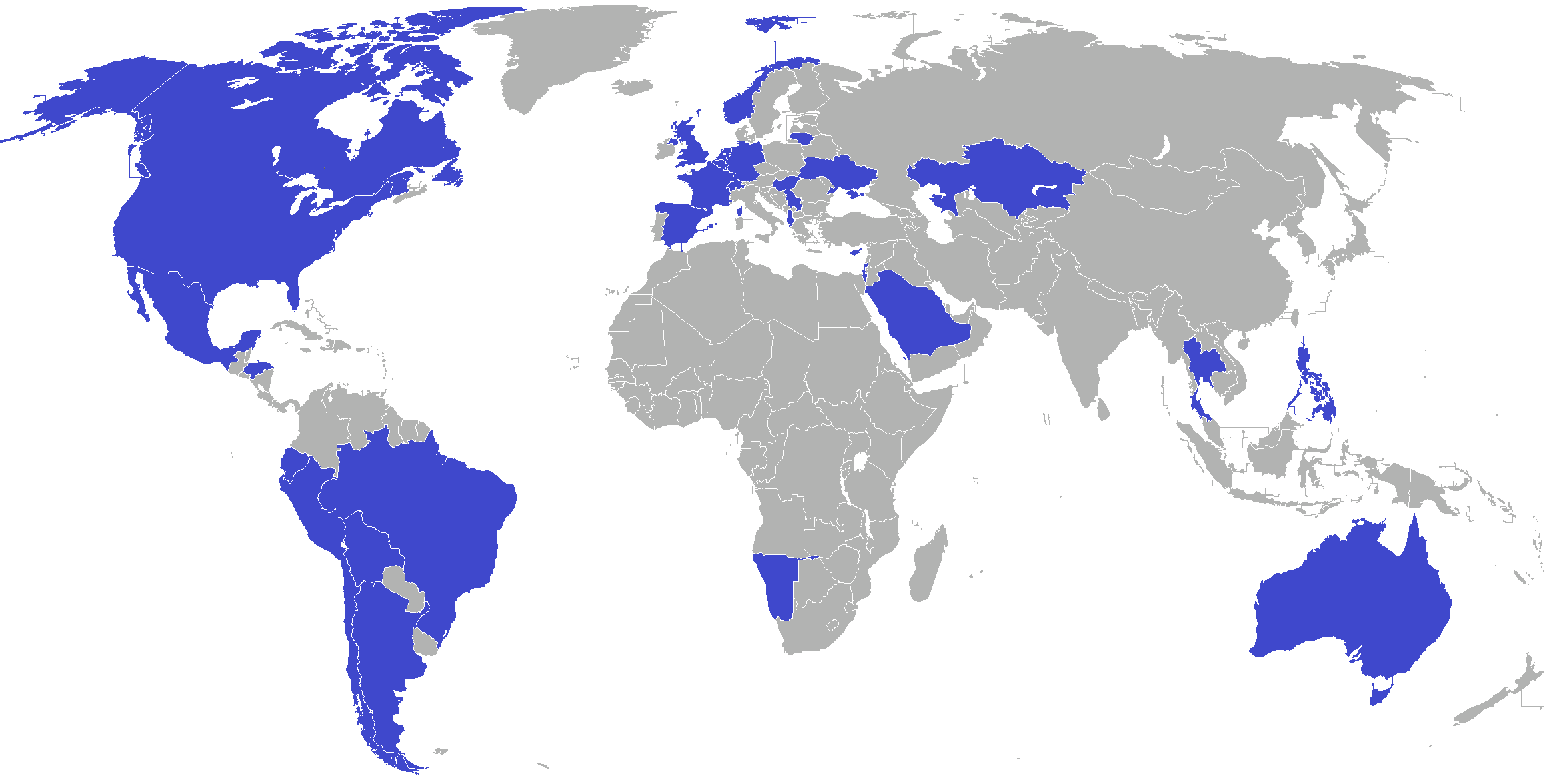
Countries that operate the H145 worldwide.

=== Current operators ===
Albania (2 H145 in service, 1 lost)
Albanian Air Force:
- 3 H145 purchased.
Belgium (1 H145M + 17 on order with the Air Force + 3 H145 with a contractor for the Air Force)
Belgian Air Force:
- Orders:
  - 15 Airbus H145M ordered for the Belgian armed forces in June 2024.
  - 3 Airbus H145M ordered for the Belgian armed forces in December 2025 for SAR role (note: the order includes 2 more for the police, listed in the Civilian and governmental operators section) .
- Deliveries:
  - 1 delivered in June 2026.
Noordzee Helikopters Vlaanderen:
- 3 H145 D2 or D3 trainers, training and helicopters provided by an external contractor, to the Belgian Air Force.
Bolivia (2 EC145)
Bolivian Air Force:

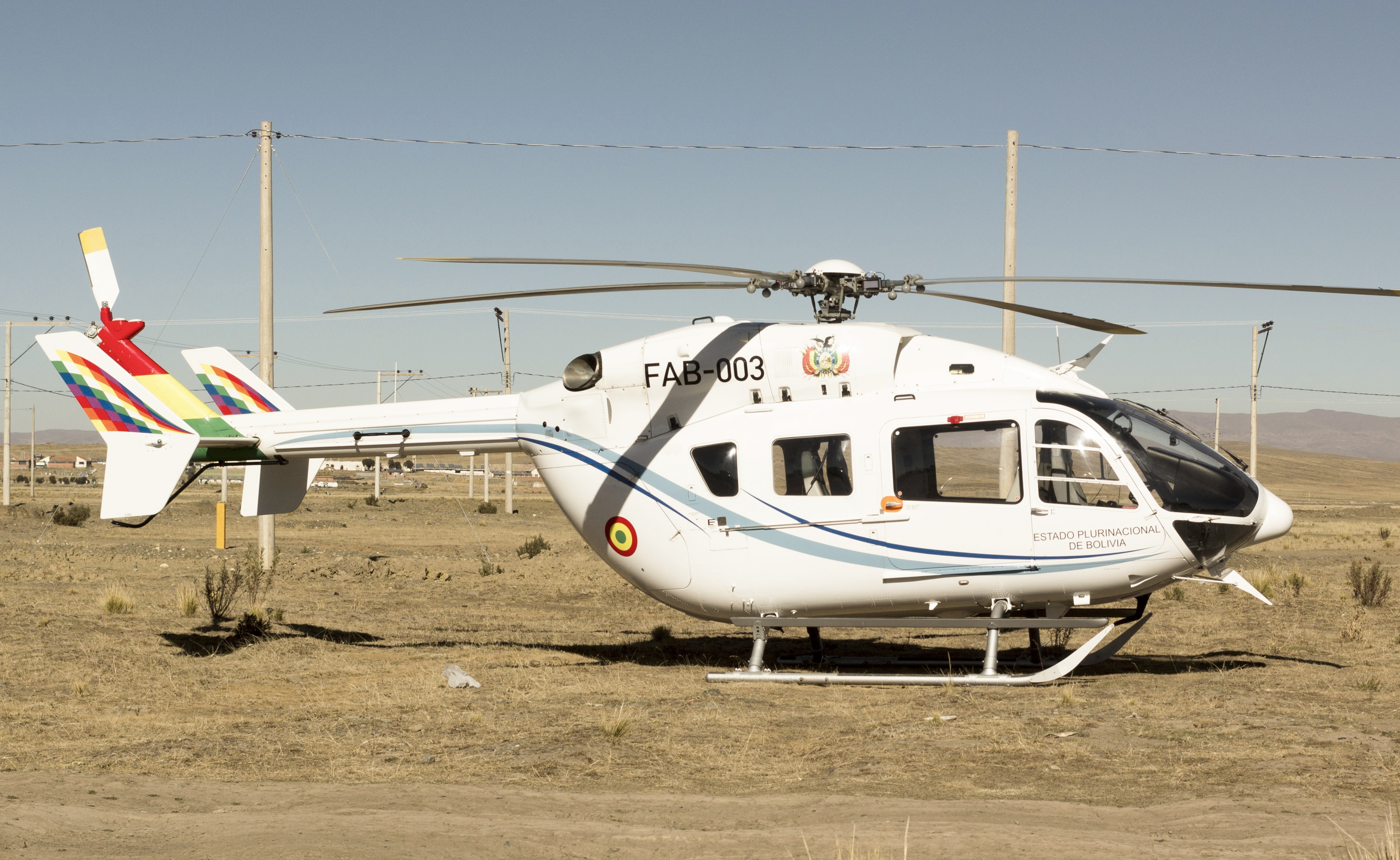
EC145 – Bolivian Air Force

- 2 Eurocopter EC145, first delivered in 2012.
Cyprus (6 H145M on order, 6 in option)
Cyprus National Guard:
- 6 Airbus H145M ordered in June 2022, and 5 delivered as of June 2025 as a successor to its fleet of Russian Mi-35, with an option for 6 additional H145M. The helicopter will be equipped with the Airbus HForce weapon system.
Ecuador (6 H145M "Cobra")
Ecuadorian Air Force:
- 6 H145M "Cobra"
  - 2 delivered in October 2020.
  - 6th delivered in January 2022.
The H145 Cobra is configured for tactical troop transport, CSAR, Medevac, firefighting, and humanitarian aid.
Germany (25 in service, 82 on order, 3 with a contractor)
H145 operated in the German armed forces.

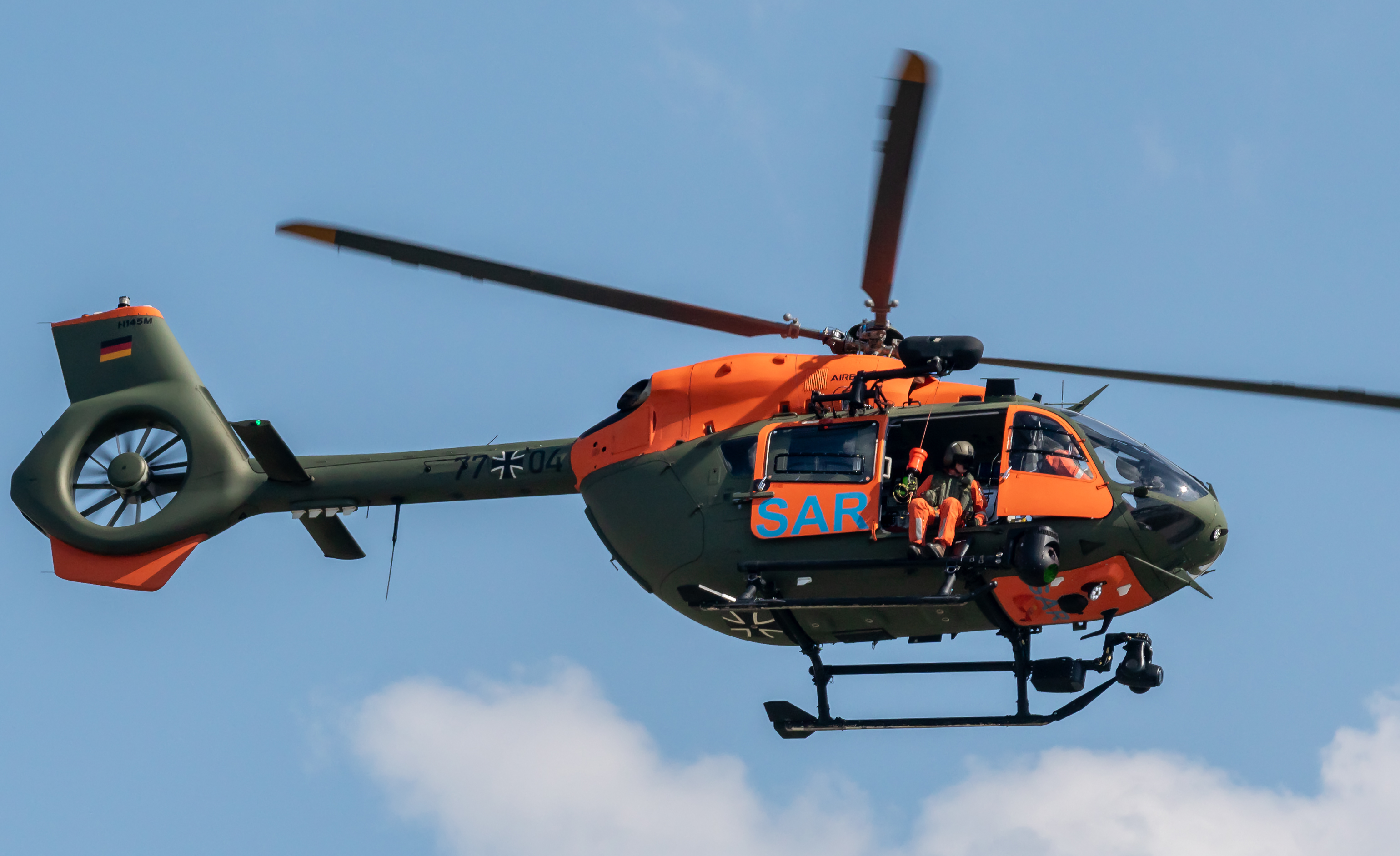
H145 LUH SAR – German Army Aviation

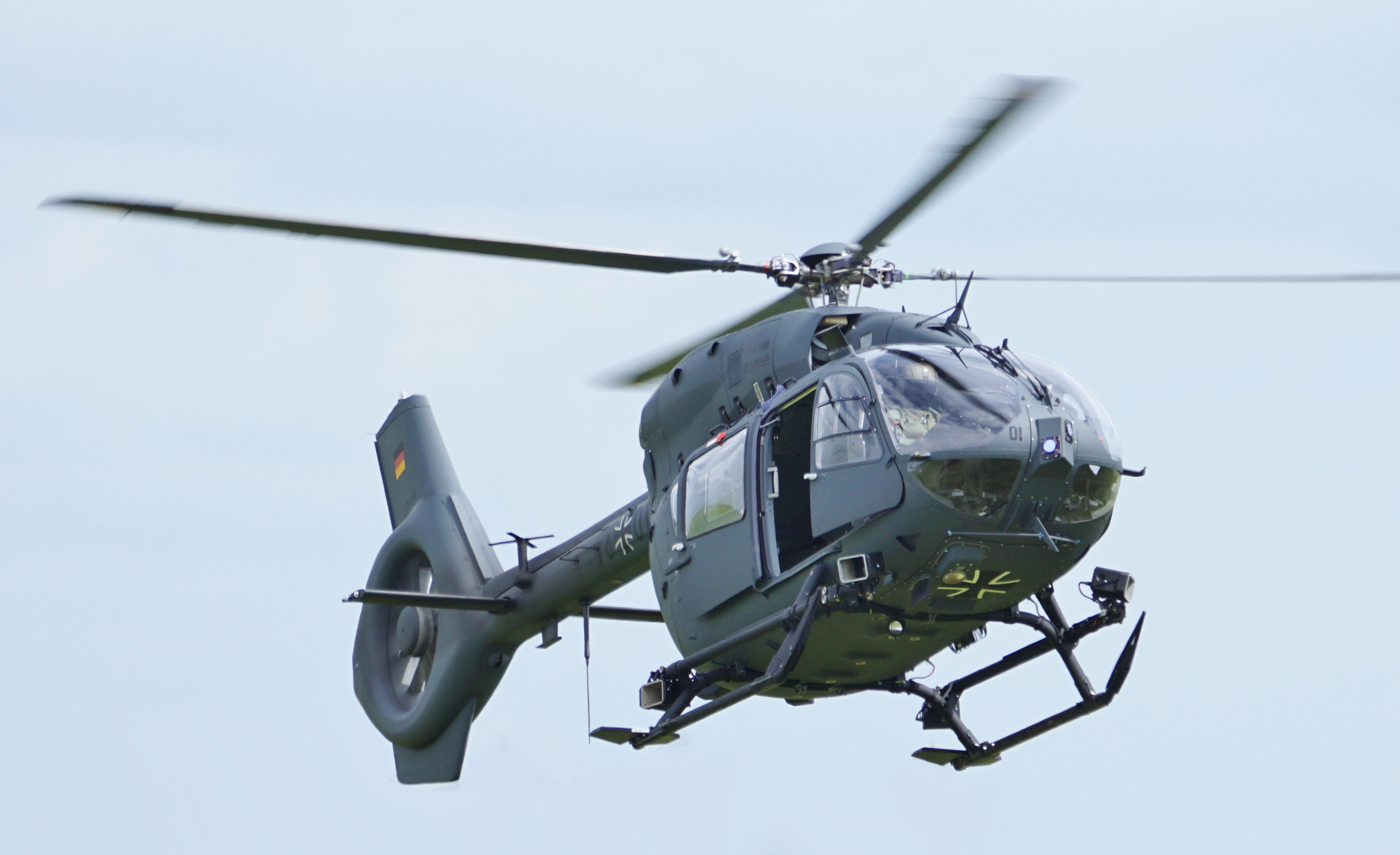
EC645 T2 LUH SOF – German Air Force – KSK

- German Army Aviation:
  - 8 Airbus H145 LUH SAR (light utility helicopter, search and rescue), delivered between 2019 and 2021, successor of the UH-1 Iroquois.
  - 72 Airbus H145M LKH ("Leichter Kampfhubschrauber" – light combat helicopter) ordered:
    - 57 in December 2023 for the Army with a first delivery in 2024:
      - 24 in combat role, equipped with the Airbus HForce system (Thales Scorpion helmet, M2 Browning or 20 mm gun pod, Rocket pods with FZ275 LGR, ATGM pods)
      - 33 in training / professionalisation role
    - 15 in December 2025
- German Air Force – special forces command:
  - 16 Airbus EC645 T2 LUH SOF, a light utility helicopter for mission support of the KSK.
  - 10 H145M LKH:
    - 5 ordered in December 2023 for the KSK.
    - 5 ordered in December 2025 for the KSK.
- Noordzee Helikopters Vlaanderen:
  - 1 Airbus H145D2 operated by NHV to train the KSK pilots.
  - 2 Airbus H145D3 operated by NHV to train the KSK pilots.
Hungary (19 H145M in service, 1 H145M lost)
Hungarian Air Force:
- 20 Airbus H145M ordered in June 2018, equipped with the Airbus HForce system.
- Losses: 1 H145M crashed in June 2023.
Kazakhstan (8 H145)
In 2010, the Kazakh government signed a framework agreement for up to 45 H145 to be assembled locally over 6 years, and to be used by civilian and military agencies. Some of the aircraft were assembled for private clients and won't be included here.
Kazakh Ministry of Defence:
- 6 KH145 search and rescue variant ordered in November 2011.
- 2 KH145 ordered for the ministry of defence ordered in 2012 as part of a broader order that includes 6 helicopters for the Emergency Situations Ministry.
Luxembourg (1 H145M)
Luxembourg Air force:
- 1 H145M delivered to the air force in January 2020, as part of an order for 2 H145M which are shared between the police and the air force. One of the helicopters has a Police livery, and the other one has a Dark grey military livery.
Serbia (15 H145M)
Serbian Air Force:
- Ten pieces armed (seven with gun pods of HForce 3 weapon system and three with gun pods of HForce 1 weapon system), five non-armed.
Thailand (5 H145M in service, 5 UH-72A in service, 1 UH-72A lost)
Royal Thai Navy:
- 5 H145M ordered in, and entered service in October 2014.
Royal Thai Army:
- 6 UH-72A Lakota ordered in 2014.
- 9 UH-72A Lakota were in option in 2014, but the option was never exercised.
- Losses: 1 UH-72A Lakota crashed in August 2016.
United Kingdom (7 Jupiter HT1 and 6 Jupiter HC2 in service)
Royal Air Force:

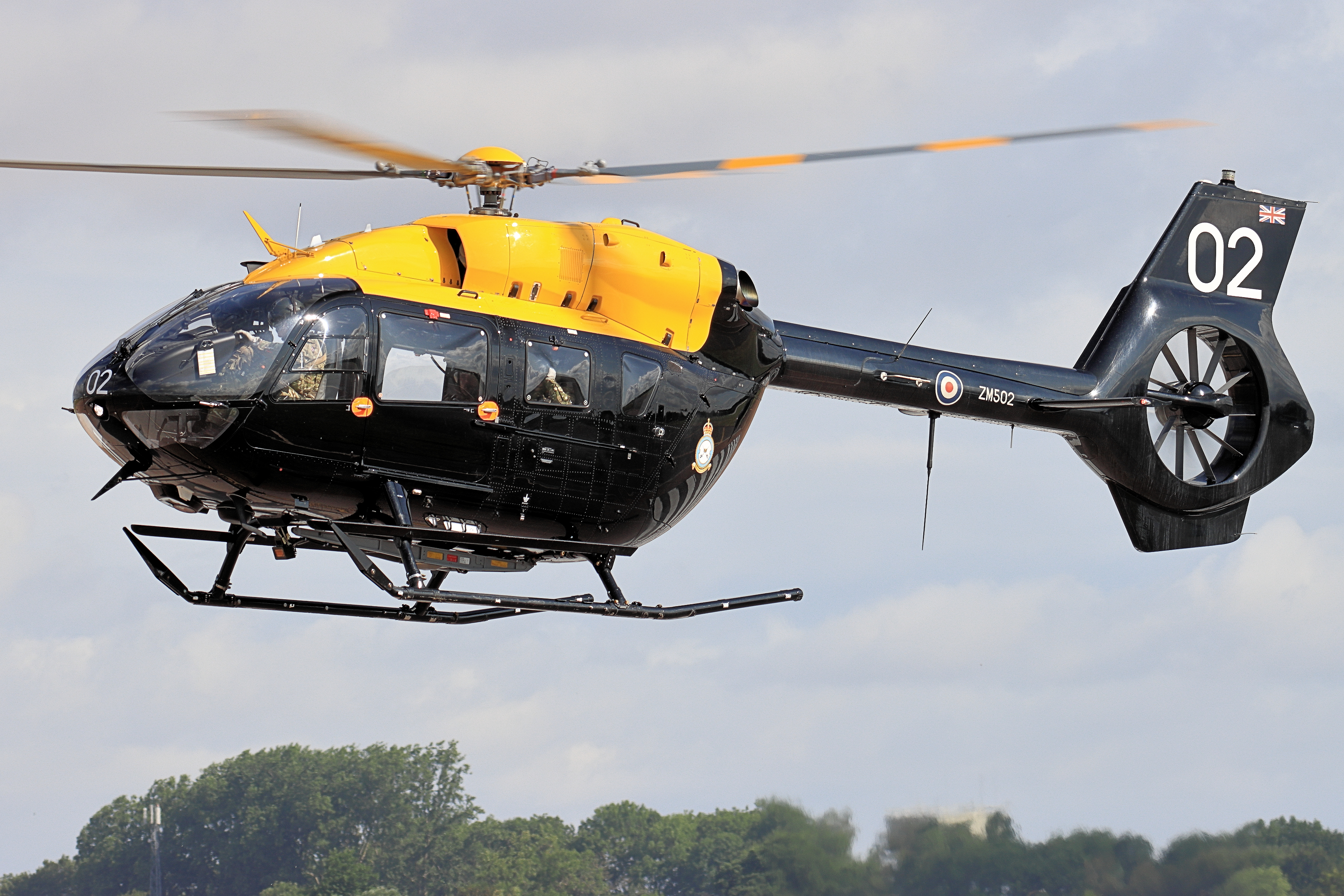
Jupiter HT1 – No. 1 Flying Training School

- 7 Jupiter HT1 used as a maritime, mountain and search and rescue training helicopter for No. 1 Flying Training School.
- 3 Jupiter HC2 for use with 84 Squadron in Cyprus
Army Air Corps:
- 3 Jupiter HC2 for use with 667 Squadron in Brunei
United States (around 485 UH-72 in service, 1 prototype, 29 on order)
UH-72 Lakota operated in the United States Armed Forces.

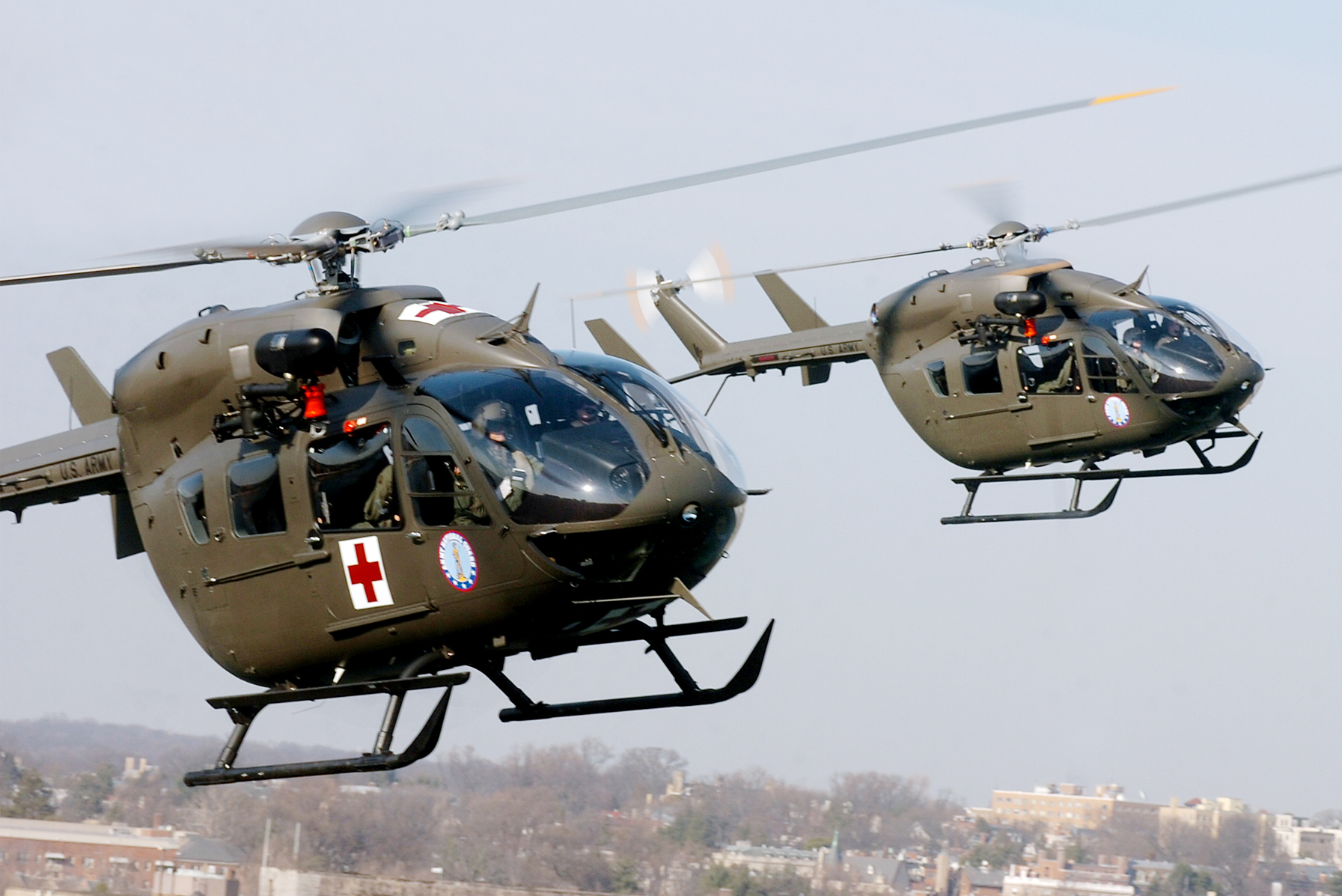
UH-72A Lakota – US Army / US National Guard

- United States Army and Army National Guard:
  - 479 UH-72A, 28 UH-72B on order as of November 2024. Roles:
    - Operations support, search and rescue, Medevac, counter drug, and disaster response.
    - Training helicopter.
- United States Navy:
  - 5 UH-72 used as training helicopter for the US Naval Test Pilot School.
- Prototypes:
  - 1 UH-72B Unmanned Logistics Connector, an unmanned variant tested by the US Marine Corps and the US Army.

=== Future operators ===
Brunei (6 H145M in order)
Royal Brunei Air Force:
- 6 Airbus H145M ordered in May 2024 as a successor to its MBB Bo 105.
Honduras (6 H145 on order)
Honduran Air Force:
- 4 Airbus H145 ordered in April 2023. The aircraft is planned to be used as transport helicopter (passenger / cargo), search and rescue, Medevac, and firefighting.
- 2 Airbus H145 ordered in April 2024.
Indonesia (4 H145D3 on order)
Indonesian Air Force:
- 4 Airbus H145D3 ordered in September 2024. The aircraft is planned to be used for training and search and rescue missions.
Ireland (4 H145M & 2 H145 on order)
Irish Air Corps:
- 4 Airbus H145M ordered in December 2024 for €91.7 million. The helicopters will be used for pilot training and for defence operations.
- 2 Airbus H145 in 2023 for the Garda Air Support Unit. The helicopters will be used for policing, surveillance and deployment of the Garda Emergency Response Unit.
Montenegro (4 H145M on order)
Montenegrin Air Force
- 4 Airbus H145M ordered in June 2026 from German Army order tranche.
Spain (50 H145M on order)
Spanish FAMET
- 50 ordered in December 2025
United Kingdom (6 H145 on order)
Royal Air Force:
- 6 Airbus H145 ordered in April 2024:
  - 3 utility helicopters to be deployed in Cyprus.
  - 3 utility helicopters to be deployed in Brunei.

=== Potential operators ===
Poland
Babcock, Airbus and CAE are offering the H145 for the training of the Polish Air Force.

== Civilian and governmental operators ==
=== Current operators ===
Australia
Operators:
- Royal Flying Doctor Service
- WA Police
- SA Police
Brazil
Brazilian operators:
- Bahia State Public Security
- Maranhão State Public Security
- Ceará Public Security
- Minas Gerais Fire Department
Canada
Canadian operators
- Royal Canadian Mounted Police
- Süreté du Québec (provincial police), 1 H145 received in 2021.
- STARS Air Ambulance
Cayman Islands
Royal Cayman Islands Police Service Air Operations Unit
France
French operators:
- Eurocopter EC145
  - 32 ordered, by the Sécurité Civile first delivered in 2002, 5 of which had an accident.
  - 15 ordered by the Gendarmerie since 2002.
- 4 Airbus H145 for the Sécurité Civile ordered in 2021 to replace the helicopters that were lost.
- 42 Airbus H145 ordered in January 2024 by the Interior Ministry to replace the EC145:
  - 36 for the Sécurité Civile (Medevac, SAR, fire-fighting), delivered since 2024 until 2028
  - 6 for the Gendarmerie (Amiens, Chamonix, Cayenne), to be delivered from 2025 until 2028.
- EC145 and H145 used for medical transport by the SAMU (Babcock, MBH Samu, SAF Aerogroup)
Georgia
Border Police:
- 2 Airbus H145 received in 2024.
Germany
State police operators:

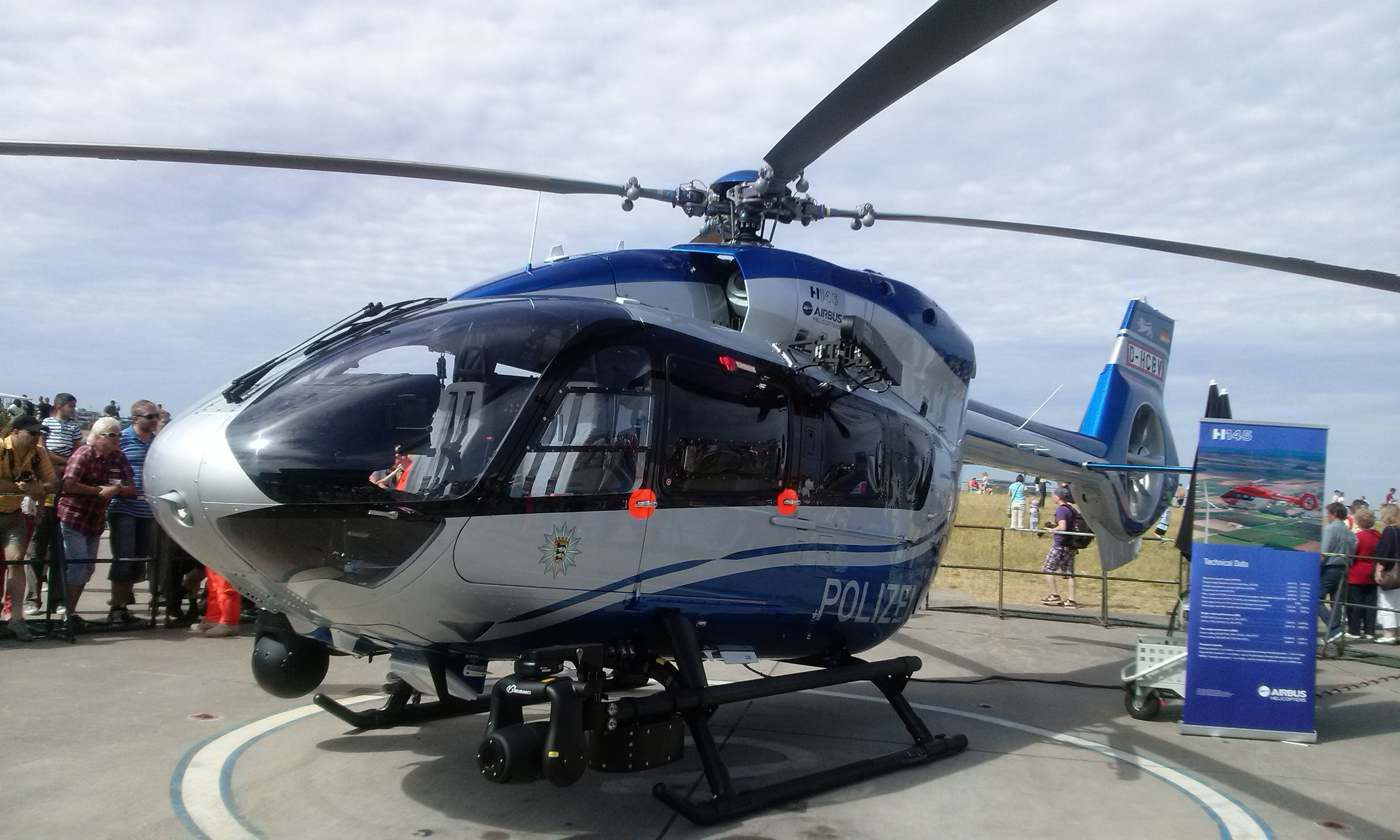
H145 D3 – Baden-Württemberg State Police:

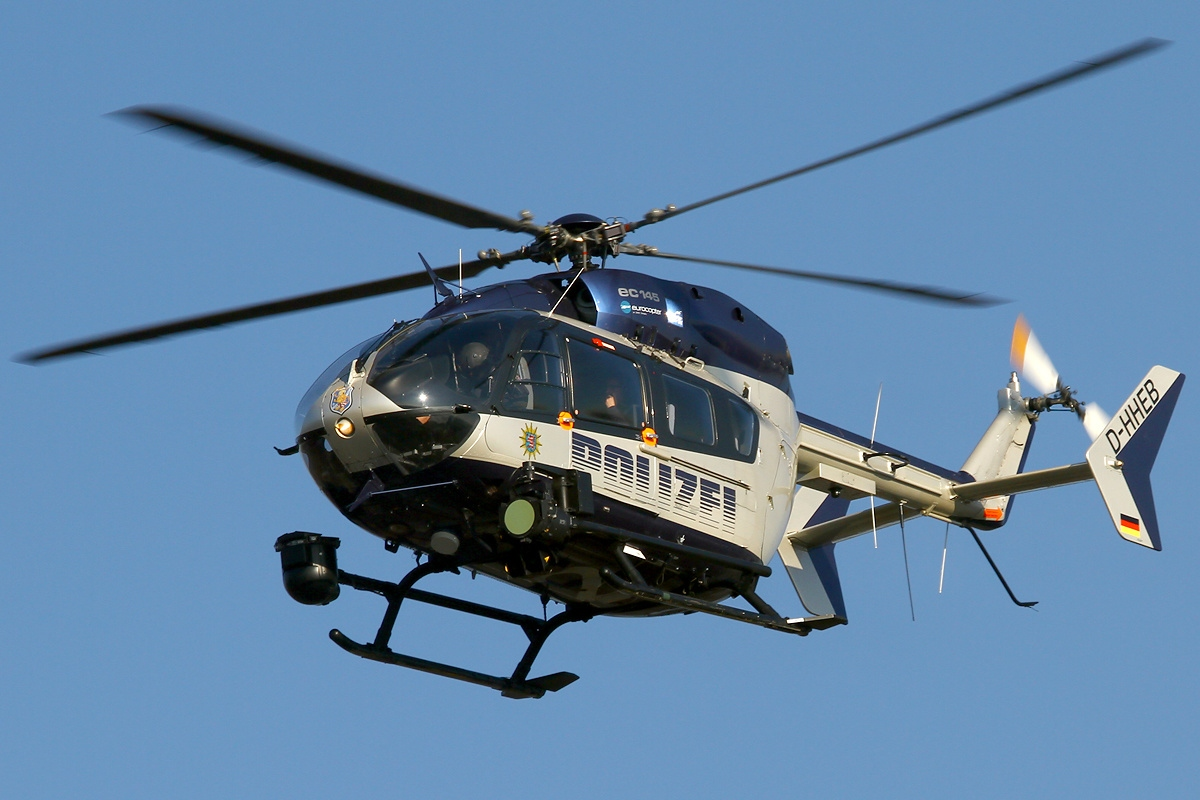
EC145 – Hesse State Police

- Bavarian State Police Helicopter Squadron:
  - 8 Airbus H145 D3 (5-blade rotor) ordered in December 2021. Delivery started in August 2023, and should last until 2025.
- Baden-Württemberg State Police:
  - 6 Airbus H145 D3 delivered from 2023.
- Hesse State Police:
  - 3 Eurocopter EC145.
- Lower-Saxony State Police:
  - 2 Airbus H145 D3 (5-blade rotor).
- Mecklenburg-Western Pomerania State Police:
  - 2 Airbus H145 D3 (5-blade rotor).
- North Rhine-Westphalia State Police:
  - 6 Airbus H145 T2 ordered in 2015, delivered by 2016. The helicopters were modernised to a 5-blade rotor in 2023.
- Rhineland-Palatinate State Police:
  - 2 Airbus H145 D3 (5-blade rotor) ordered in July 2022, delivered in August 2024.
- Saxony State Police:
  - 3 Airbus H145 D3 (5-blade rotor) delivered in 2024.
- Saxony-Anhalt State Police:
  - 2 Airbus H145 D3 (5-blade rotor) delivered in August 2024.
- Thuringia State Police:
  - 2 Eurocopter EC145 received in 2019, second-hand helicopters.
Medevac helicopters:
- ADAC:
  - 14 Eurocopter EC145 T2 ordered in 2012 upgraded to 5-blade rotor variant in 2021.
- DRF Luftrettung
  - 20 H145 D2 to be upgraded to 5-blade rotor variant in January 2020 contract.
  - 15 H145 D3 (5-blade rotor) ordered in January 2020 contract.
  - 7 H145 D3 (5-blade rotor) ordered in February 2024 with 3 in option.
Iraq
Ministry of Oil:
- 4 H145s were requested in 2014 and deliveries were finalised in June 2017, Although the Ministry of Oil is considered to be a civilian operator, the aircraft are being maintained by the Iraqi Army Aviation Command
Israel
Israel Police:
- 2 H145 D2 ordered in 2015.
Kazakhstan (6 KH145)
In 2010, the Kazakh government signed a framework agreement for up to 45 H145 to be assembled locally over 6 years, and to be used by civilian and military agencies. Some of the aircraft were assembled for private clients, and won't be included here.
Kazakh Emergency Situations Ministry:
- 6 KH145 Medevac helicopters ordered for the ministry of defence ordered in 2012 as part of a broader order that includes 2 helicopters for the Ministry of Defence.
Lithuania
State Border Guard Service:

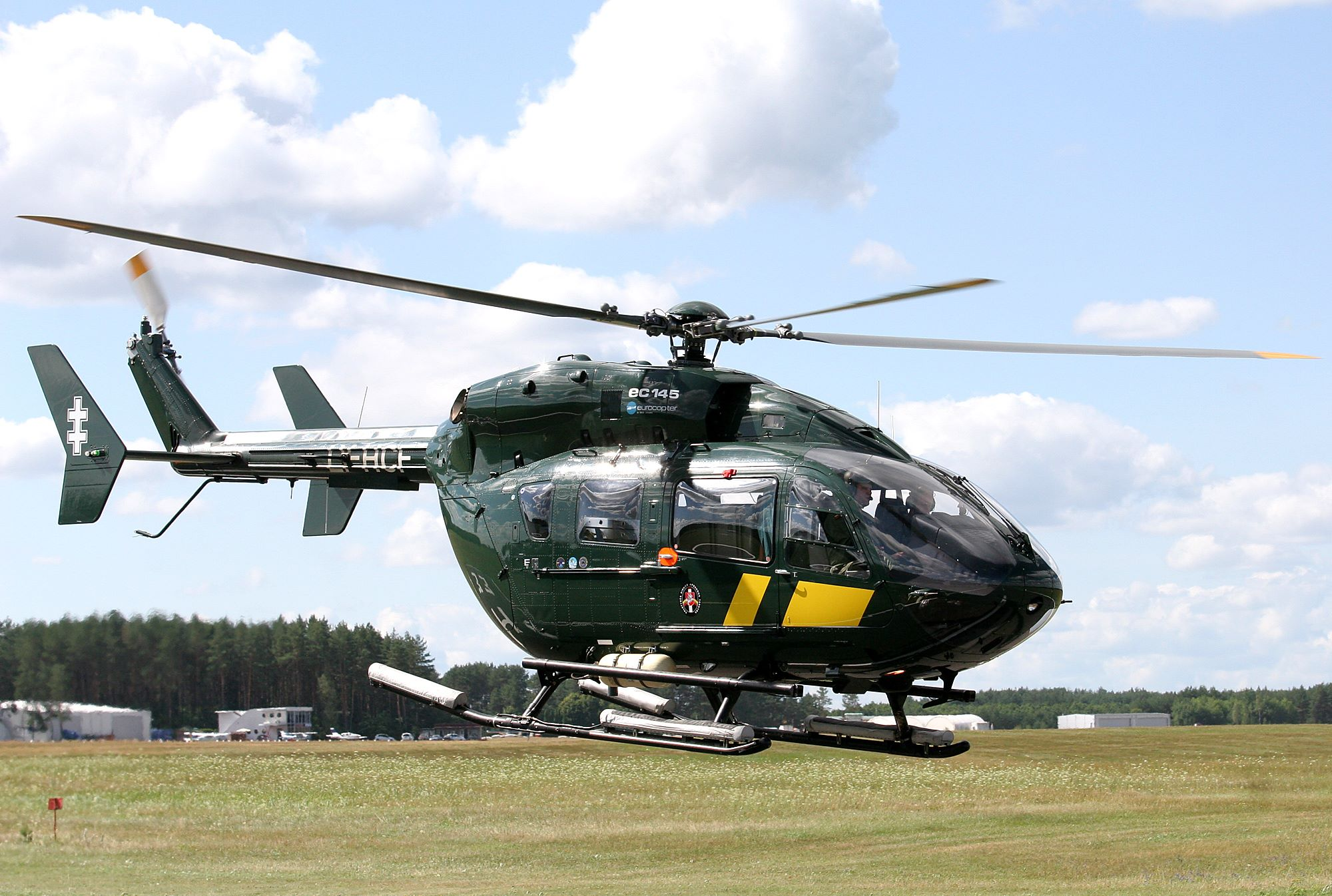
EC145 – Lithuanian State Border Guard Service

- 1 Eurocopter EC145
- 3 Airbus H145 D3 (5-blade rotor) ordered in 2023.
Luxembourg (1 H145M)
Grand Ducal Police:
- 1 H145M delivered to the Police in November 2019, as part of an order for 2 H145M which are shared between the police and the Air force. One of the helicopters has a Police livery, and the other one has a Dark grey military livery.
Mongolia
Mongolian National Emergency Management Agency:
- 3 Eurocopter EC145 purchased in 2021

337th Airborne Corps of Mongolia

Morocco
Royal Moroccan Gendarmerie:
- 6 Eurocopter EC145 purchased from the Rega (air rescue) with its equipment, to be used as rescue helicopter.
  - 5 delivered in November 2019.
  - 1 retired in August 2020, and delivered to Morocco.
Namibia
Namibian Police Force:
- 1 Eurocopter EC145 purchased in 2011.
Netherlands
ANWB Medical Air Assistance
New Zealand
GCH Aviation
- 4 Airbus H145 sold by REGA in February 2024 to GCH Aviation air rescue ambulance services in New Zealand. The delivery will take place once the new generation of H145 enters service.
  - 3 Airbus H145 D2
  - 1 Airbus H145 D3 HB-ZOO Otago Rescue Helicopter Trust
- Airbus H145 D3 (5-blade rotor)
Norway
Norsk Luftambulanse:
- Airbus H145 D3 (5-blade rotor)
Philippines
Philippine Coast Guard:

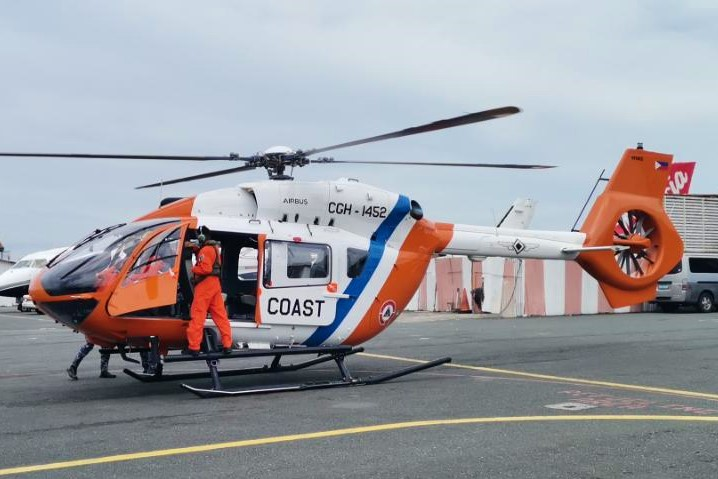
H145M – Philippine Coast Guard

- 1 to 2 Eurocopter EC145 for search and rescue missions.
Saudi Arabia
Ministry of Interior:
- 23 H145 D2 ordered in June 2015.
Serbia (4 H145M)
Serbian Interior Ministry:
- 4 Airbus H145M ordered in December 2016 for the Police as part of a larger order for 9 H145M, 5 of which for the Air Force.
Switzerland
Rega (air rescue):

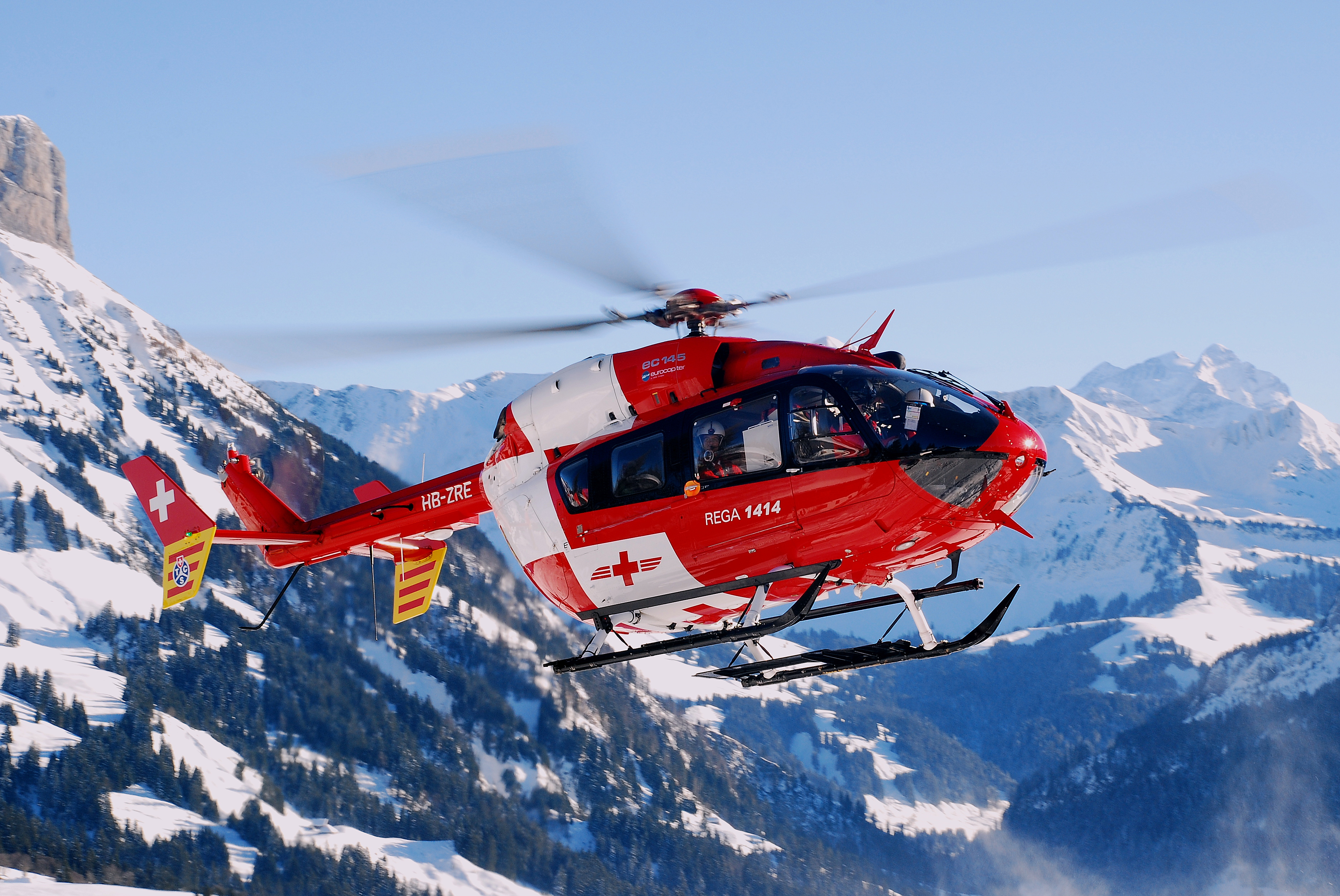
Eurocopter EC 145.

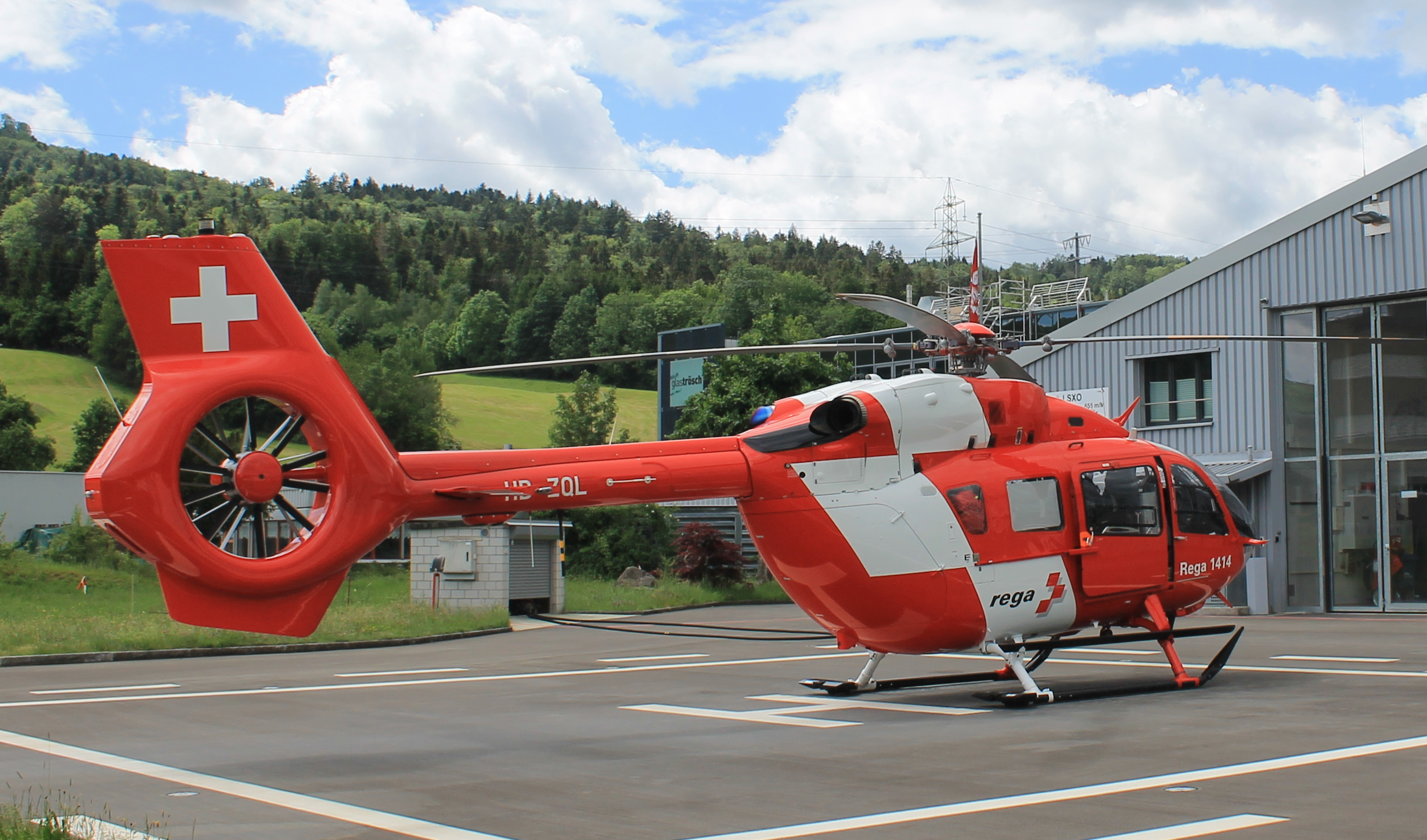
Airbus H145 D2

Current rescue fleet:
- 11 AW109SP Da Vinci (ordered in 2009)
- 6 Airbus H145 D2 (4-blade rotor), that replaced the EC145, it was ordered in 2016 and delivered in 2018–19.
- 1 Airbus H145 D3 HB-ZOO, ordered in 2018.
- 1 Airbus H145 D3 (5-blade rotor), first of its kind delivered in December 2024, 20 more to be delivered by 2026.
Future fleet:
- 21 Airbus H145 D3 (5-blade rotor)
  - 9 ordered in March 2022 to replace the 6 Airbus H145 D2 and the Airbus H145 D3 HB-ZOO.
  - 12 ordered February 2023 to replace the AW109SP Da Vinci used in mountain operations.
  - December 2022, approval for the complete renewal of the fleet towards the H145 D3 (5-blade rotor). The order was placed in February 2023, and this order intends to replace the AW109SP Da Vinci used in mountain operations.
Helicopters sold to:
- 6 Eurocopter EC145 ordered in 2001, retired in 2019/20, sold with its equipment to the Moroccan Gendarmerie to be used as rescue helicopter.
  - 5 delivered in November 2019.
  - 1 retired in August 2020, and delivered to Morocco.
- 4 Airbus H145 sold in February 2024 for the sale of GCH Aviation air rescue ambulance services in New Zealand. The delivery will take place once the new generation of H145 enters service.
  - 3 Airbus H145 D2
  - 1 Airbus H145 D3 HB-ZOO
Taiwan
APEX Aviation
Ukraine

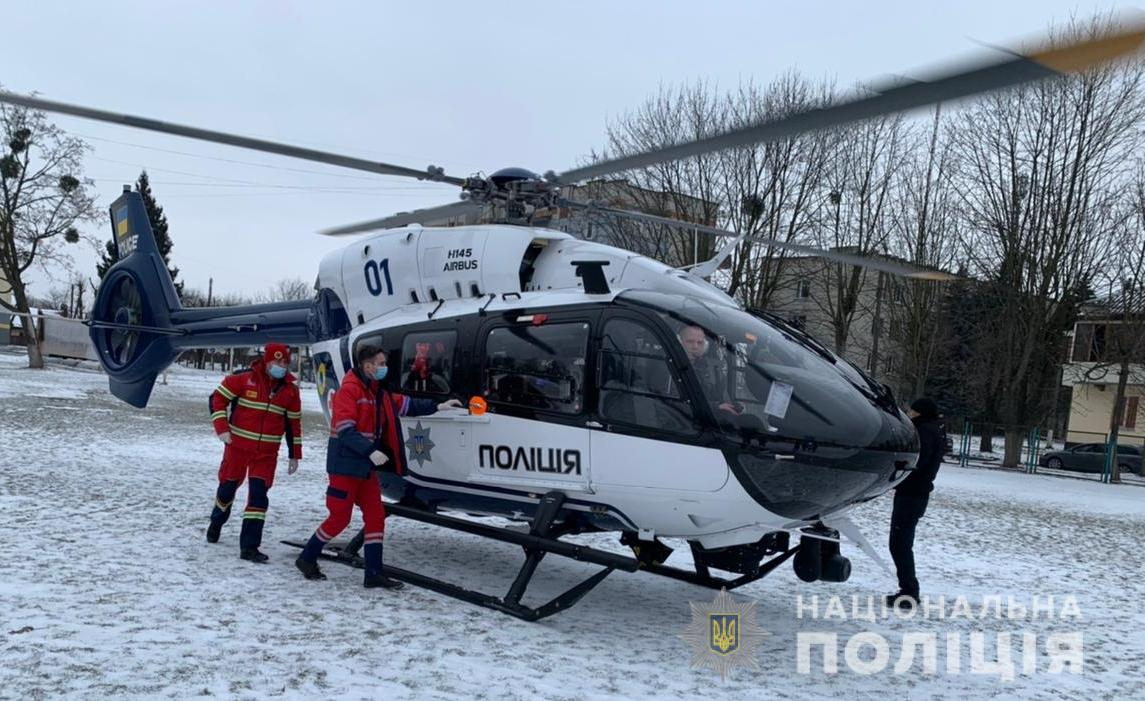
EC145 – National Police of Ukraine

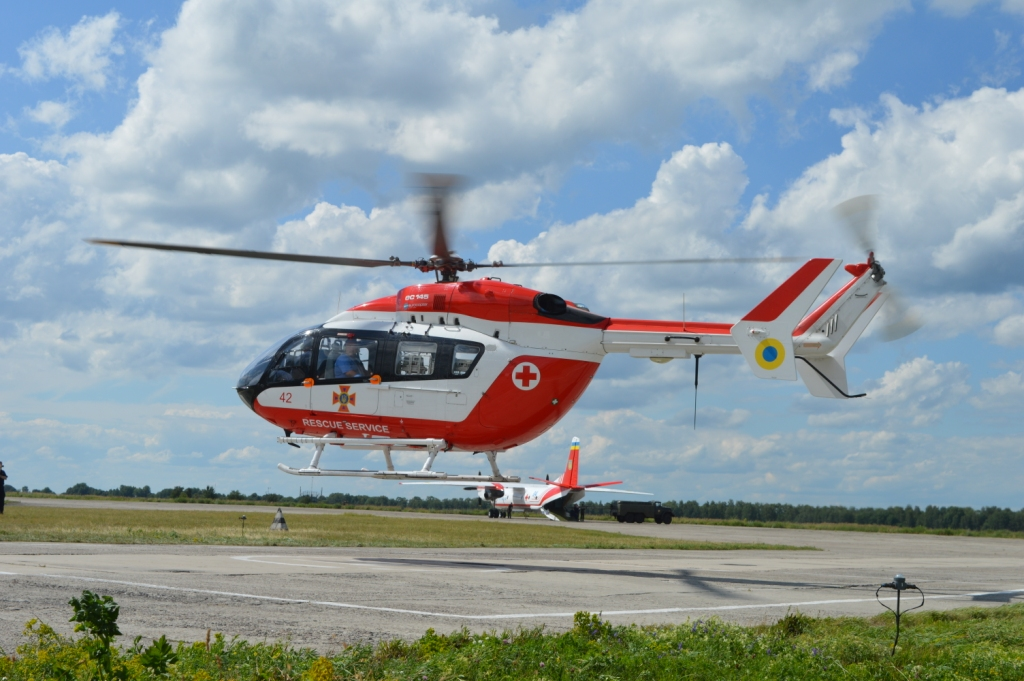
EC145 – State Emergency Service of Ukraine

State Emergency Service of Ukraine
- 2 Eurocopter EC145 ordered for rescue / emergency missions.
Saudi Arabia
Ministry of Interior
- 10 Airbus H145 D2 ordered in 2019, of which 8 orders were switched to the D3 (5-blade rotors) variant.
United Kingdom
East Anglian Air Ambulance:
- 2 Airbus H145 D2 used, modernised with the 5-blade rotor.
Scottish Ambulance Service:
- 2 Airbus H145 D2 ordered in 2017.
Yorkshire Air Ambulance:
- 3 Airbus H145 D3 (5-blade rotor) delivered between March 2023 and December 2024.
Wales Air Ambulance:
- 4 Airbus H145 ordered in 2017.
National Police Air Service:
- 19 Eurocopter EC135 and EC145
Police Service of Northern Ireland:
- Eurocopter EC145 purchased in 2012.
United States

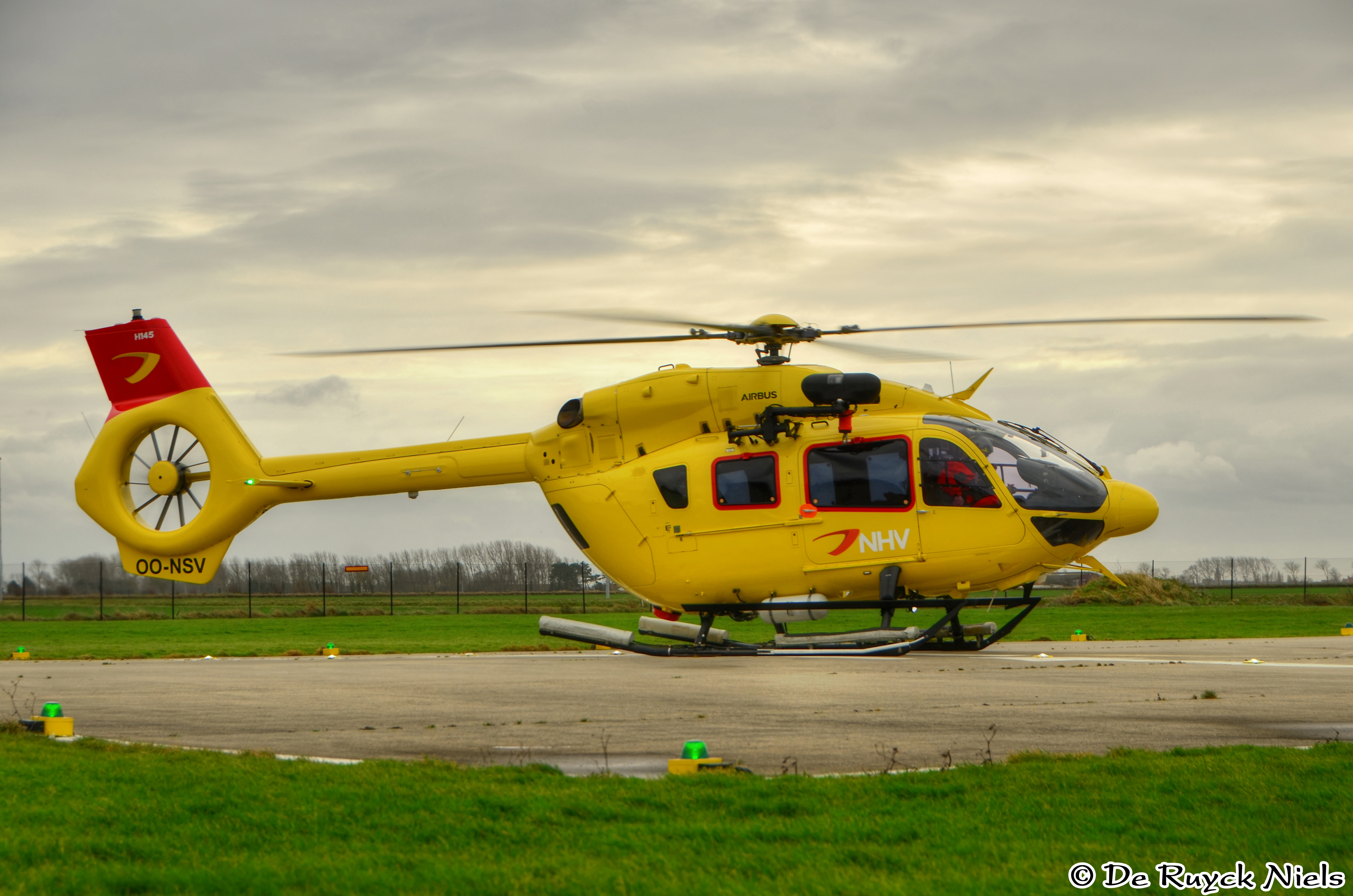
Ostend – EBNH

AirMed Utah:
- Eurocopter EC145.
Boston MedFlight:
- 5 Airbus H145 in service.
Las Vegas Metropolitan Police Department:
- 1 Airbus H145 D2 purchased in 2017.
OSF HealthCare Life Flight (Peoria, IL):
- Eurocopter EC145
Riverside County Sheriff's Department:
- 1 Airbus H145.
Sanford Health Airmed:
- Eurocopter EC145.
- Airbus H145.
Suffolk County Police Department:
- 2 Eurocopter EC145.
Texas Department of Public Safety
- 1 Eurocopter EC145
UW Med Flight
- 1 Eurocopter EC145

=== Future operators ===
Australia (4)
Australian Border Force:
- 2 Airbus H145 D3 (5-blade rotors) ordered in May 2025.
Bahrain
Bahraini police:
- 9 Airbus H145 D3 (5-blade rotors) ordered in December 2024.
Belgium (2)
Belgian Federal Police:
- 2 H145M ordered in June 2024, with 3 options.
Czech Republic (11)
Czech Ministroy of Interior
- 11 H145 ordered in May 2026, replacing the H135.
Romania (5)
Romanian Ministry of Internal Affairs:
- 5 H145 approved for purchase in May 2026

== Accidents ==
As of August 2024 the EC145 has been involved in 67 incidents with 49 fatalities.

== Specifications (H145) ==
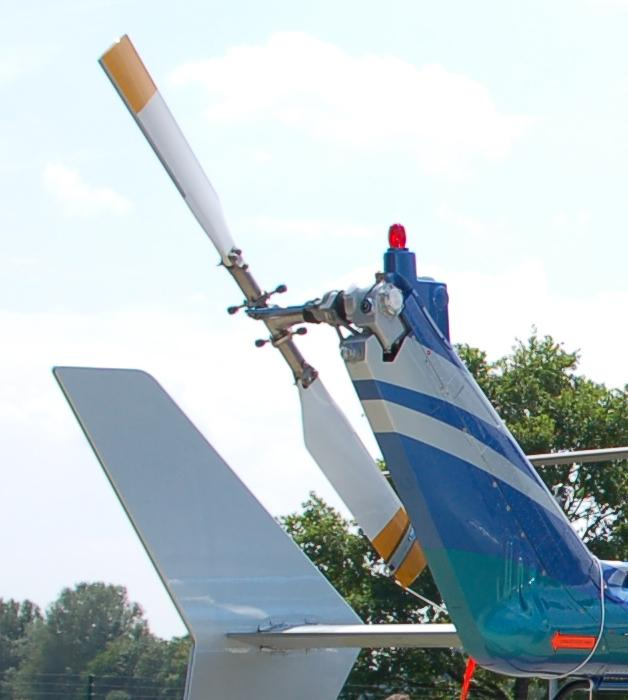
The original tail rotor design used on the earlier EC145s. Now replaced with a Fenestron.

Data from Airbus H145 technical description, Eurocopter EC145 technical data, EC 145 specs

General characteristics

- Crew: 1 or 2
- Capacity: Up to 10 pax / 1,905 kg (4,200 lb) payload
- Length: 13.54 m (44 ft 5 in)
- Height: 3.45 m (11 ft 4 in) (EC145 C-2)
- Volume: 6.03 m^{3} (213 cu ft)
- Empty weight: 1,895 kg (4,178 lb) baseline aircraft definitions
- Max takeoff weight: 3,800 kg (8,378 lb) with or without external load
- Fuel capacity: 723 kg (1,594 lb)
- Useful lift: 1,600 kg (3,500 lb) dual cargo hook load (single hook)
- Powerplant: 2 × Safran Arriel 2E turboshaft engines, 667 kW (894 hp) each for take-off
- Main rotor diameter: 10.8 m (35 ft 5 in)
- Main rotor area: 95 m^{2} (1,020 sq ft) root: NACA 23012; tip: NACA 23010

Performance

- Cruise speed: 241 km/h (150 mph, 130 kn) (recommendation for H145)
- Never exceed speed: 268 km/h (167 mph, 145 kn) (EC145 C-2)
- Range: 650 km (400 mi, 350 nmi) with standard fuel tanks at SL
- Ferry range: 855 km (531 mi, 462 nmi) (EC145 C-2)
- Endurance: 3 h 35 min
- Service ceiling: 6,096 m (20,000 ft) for take-off and landing
- Rate of climb: 8.1 m/s (1,590 ft/min) (EC145 C-2)

== See also ==
Related development

- MBB/Kawasaki BK 117
- Eurocopter UH-72 Lakota
- Eurocopter EC135

Aircraft of comparable role, configuration, and era

- AgustaWestland AW169
- AVIC AC332
- Bell 429
- HAL Dhruv
- Kazan Ansat
- Kamov Ka-226
- Sikorsky S-76

Related lists

- List of rotorcraft
