= Cipra =

Cipra is a surname. Notable people with the surname include:

- Barry Arthur Cipra (born 1952), American mathematician and writer
- Jean Camille Cipra (1893–1952), French painter of Czech descent
- Milo Cipra (1906–1985), Croatian composer
