= Marina Municipal Airport =

Municipal Airport in Marina, California

- Plane within the airport.
- IATA: OAR; ICAO: KOAR; FAA LID: OAR

Summary
- Airport type: Public
- Owner: City of Marina
- Location: Marina, California
- Elevation AMSL: 137 ft (42 m)
- Coordinates: 36°40′53″N 121°45′42″W
- Interactive map of Marina Municipal Airport

Runways
Direction	Length		Surface
Direction	ft	m	Surface
11/29	3,483	1,062	Asphalt

Statistics (2006)
- Aircraft operations: 40,000
- Based aircraft: 69
- Source: Federal Aviation Administration

Marina Municipal Airport (IATA: OAR, ICAO: KOAR, FAA LID: OAR) is a public airport located two miles (3 km) east of the central business district of Marina, a city in Monterey County, California, United States. It is owned by the City of Marina.

The airport is on the former site of the Fritzsche Army Air Field, built in the early 1960s at Fort Ord, which closed in 1994.

== Facilities and aircraft ==
Marina Municipal Airport has one asphalt paved runway (11/29) measuring 3,483 x 75 ft. (1,062 x 23 m).

For the 12-month period ending August 31, 2006, the airport had 40,000 aircraft operations, an average of 109 per day, all of which were general aviation. There are 69 aircraft based at this airport: 87% single engine, 6% multi-engine, 3% helicopters and 4% ultralight.

The Naval Postgraduate School, based in the nearby city of Monterey, has a Center for Interdisciplinary Remotely-Piloted Aircraft Studies (NPS/CIRPAS) at this airport.

Skydive Monterey Bay conducts skydiving and parachuting activities on the south east side of the Marina Municipal Airport.

In 2021, a manufacturing facility for Joby Aviation was approved at the airport.
