= Optionally piloted vehicle =

Aircraft capable of uncrewed flight yet able to be manually piloted

An optionally piloted vehicle (OPV) or optionally piloted aerial vehicle is a hybrid between a conventional piloted aircraft and an unmanned aerial vehicle (UAV).

Able to fly with or without a human crew on board the aircraft, OPVs are a low-cost alternative to UAVs in research, experimentation, and concept exploration, but may also become used in mainstream operations as familiarity with them increases. Unimpeded by a human's physiological limitations, an OPV is able to operate under more adverse conditions and/or for greater endurance times. Retaining on-board controls, the OPV can operate as a conventional aircraft during missions for which direct human control is preferred or desired as an immediate option.

The US Naval Postgraduate School Center for Interdisciplinary Remotely-Piloted Aircraft Studies (CIRPAS) in Monterey, California operates a highly modified Cessna 337-O2 Skymaster OPV called Pelican. The OPV provides a low-risk, low-cost test and evaluation alternative to a Predator UAV. The Pelican has also provided UAV support to military exercises which otherwise would not have had access to a real UAV due to cost, availability, or FAA restrictions. The Northrop Grumman Firebird is classified as an OPV. The National Test Pilot School certified an extensively modified Cessna 150 as an Optionally Piloted Aircraft for use as a training device to aid instruction of flight testing unmanned systems. Additionally, Autonodyne has operated an OPV Cessna 182 since 2018, which uses their onboard Avidyne Corporation to be piloted from the Autonodyne ground control software, relay communications between Air Traffic Control and the ground pilot, and autonomously detect and avoid hazardous traffic via wing-mounted cameras.

== See also ==
- Unmanned aerial vehicle
- Radio-controlled aircraft
