= Jean Camille Cipra =

French painter (1893–1952)

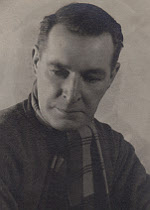
Kamil Cipra Czech and French painter

Jean Camille Cipra (16 April 1893 – 1952) was a French landscape painter.

He was born in Plzeň, Bohemia, Austria-Hungary. He died in Paris in 1952. He emigrated to France and lived in Bourges. Cipra exhibited his works for many years at the Salon des Indépendants and at the Salon d'Automne. He is famous for his landscapes of the Loire Valley, Burgundy, Normandy and Brittany.

His Paysage de Loire is in the Musée de la Loire, Cosne-sur-Loire.

== Exhibitions ==
- Jean-Camille Cipra exhibition, the City Museum of La Charité-sur-Loire, June 7 to September 30, 2006.

== Sources ==
- Musée de la Loire in Cosne-sur-Loire
