= Center for Interdisciplinary Remotely-Piloted Aircraft Studies =

The Center for Interdisciplinary Remotely-Piloted Aircraft Studies (CIRPAS) located at the Marina Municipal Airport and is a research center of the US Naval Postgraduate School (NPS), based in the nearby city of Monterey. Among their research is work done with Optionally Piloted Vehicles.

The National Science Foundation has granted $11m to modify an A-10 to perform weather research for CIRPAS, to continue the effort after the T-28 that was retired in 2005.
