= Eurocopter EC135 =

Small utility helicopter

EC135 H135
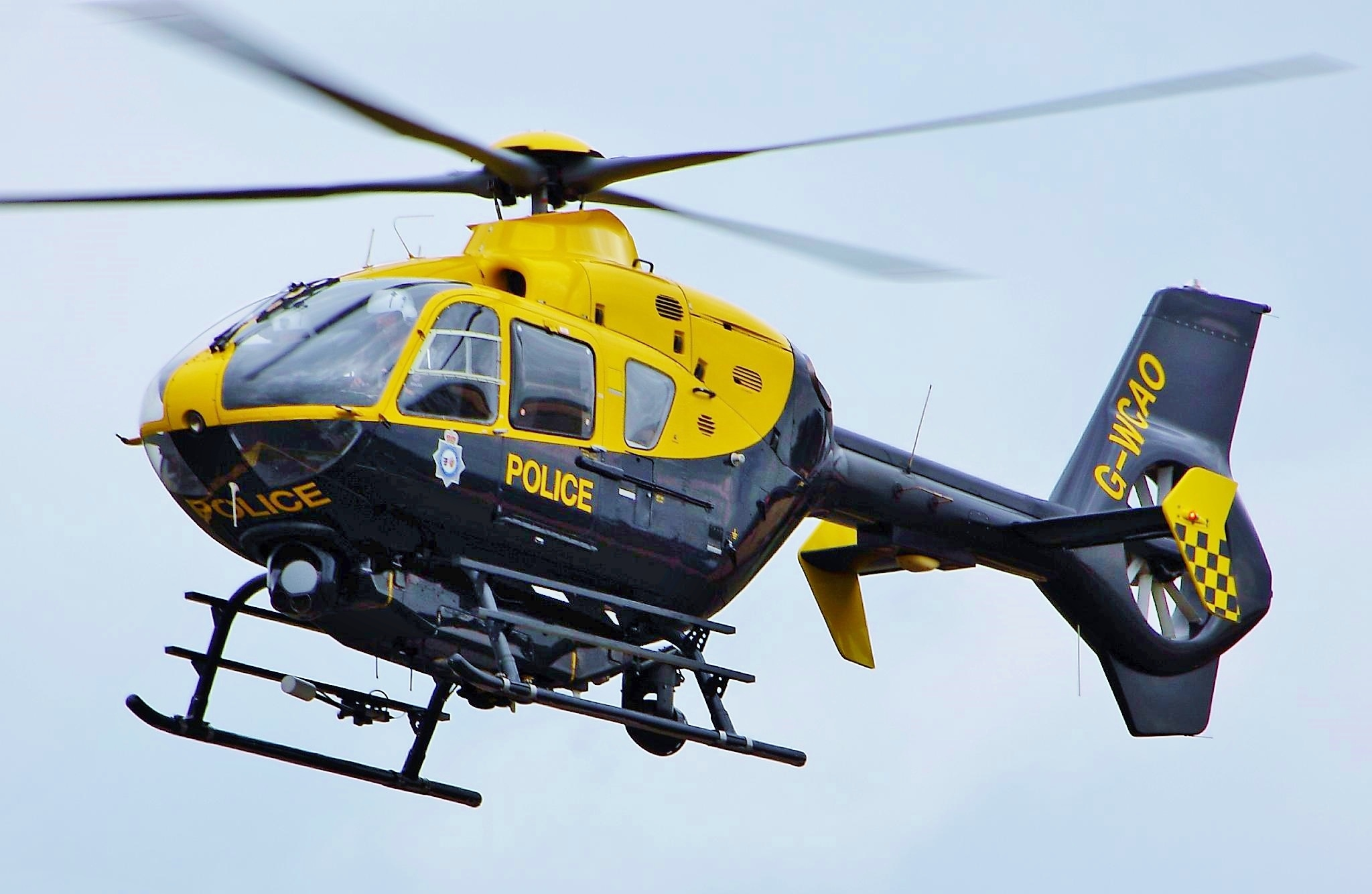
- An EC135T2 used by the National Police Air Service for England & Wales

General information
- Type: Light utility helicopter
- National origin: Multinational
- Manufacturer: Airbus Helicopters (since 2014); Eurocopter
- Status: In service
- Number built: 1,400 (Sep. 2020)

History
- Manufactured: 1995–present
- Introduction date: 1996
- First flight: 15 February 1994
- Variant: Eurocopter EC635

The Airbus Helicopters H135 (formerly Eurocopter EC135) is a twin-engine civil light utility helicopter produced by Airbus Helicopters. It is capable of flight under instrument flight rules and is outfitted with a digital automatic flight control system. First flying in February 1994 and developed from the prototype Messerschmitt-Bölkow-Blohm MBB Bo 108, it entered service in 1996. 1,400 units have been delivered up to September 2020, to 300 operators in 60 countries, accumulating over 5 million flight hours. It is mainly used for air medical transport (medevac), corporate transport, law enforcement, offshore wind support, and military flight training. Half of the units in service are in Europe and a quarter in North America. The H135M is the military variant.

== Development ==
=== Origins ===
The H135 started development prior to the formation of Eurocopter, under Messerschmitt-Bölkow-Blohm (MBB) under the designation Bo 108 in the 1970s. MBB developed it in partnership with Aérospatiale, the Bo 108 was initially intended to be a technology demonstrator, combining attributes of the successful MBB Bo 105 with new advances and an aerodynamically streamlined design. Technologies included on the Bo 108 included the first full-authority digital engine controls (FADEC) on a helicopter, a hingeless main rotor, and the adoption of a new transmission. The first prototype made its first flight on 17 October 1988, powered by two Allison 250-C20R/1 engines. A second Bo 108 followed in June 1991, this time with two Turbomeca TM319-1B Arrius engines. Unlike later production aircraft, both technology demonstrators flew with conventional tail rotors.

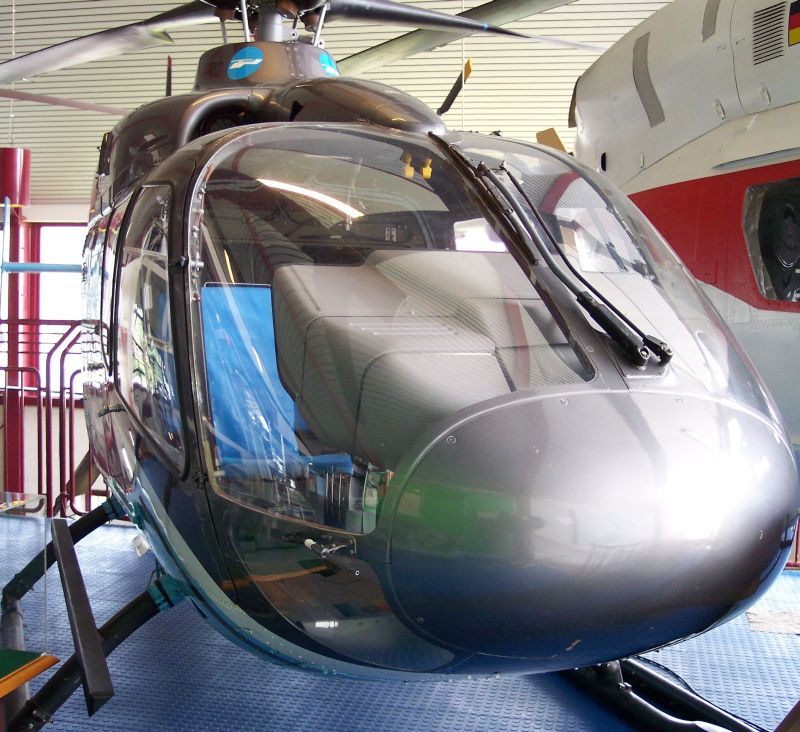
A Bo 108 prototype

In the late 1990s, the design was revised with the introduction of the Fenestron tail rotor system, an advanced bearingless main rotor, composite materials, and resonance isolation systems. It was decided to pursue a full certification program, resulting in the production of two pre-production prototypes. At the same time, the Bo 108 was given a new designation of EC135, to correspond with the newly created Eurocopter company. At this point, it was decided that the EC135 should be developed with the option of being powered by two competing engines, the Turbomeca Arrius 2B and the Pratt & Whitney Canada PW206B engines. Two pre-production prototypes were built in 1994 powered by either engine, both powerplants proved to be successful and were used on subsequent production aircraft.

In January 1995, the EC135 made its first public appearance at the Heli-Expo convention at Las Vegas, at which prospective buyers were reportedly impressed with its appearance and performance figures. Another feature which became apparent upon entering service was the low noise levels produced, in part due to its Fenestron tail, the EC135 was the quietest aircraft in its class for more than 15 years. Despite the helicopter's design being primarily oriented towards emergency medical operators, the EC135 had considerable appeal to a wide range of operators. European JAA certification was achieved in June 1996, with FAA approval following in July.

In December 1999, the EC135 was granted single-pilot instrument flight rules certification by Germany's Luftfahrt-Bundesamt. In December 2000, the United Kingdom's Civil Aviation Authority also gave the EC135 single-pilot instrument flight rules certification.

=== Further development ===
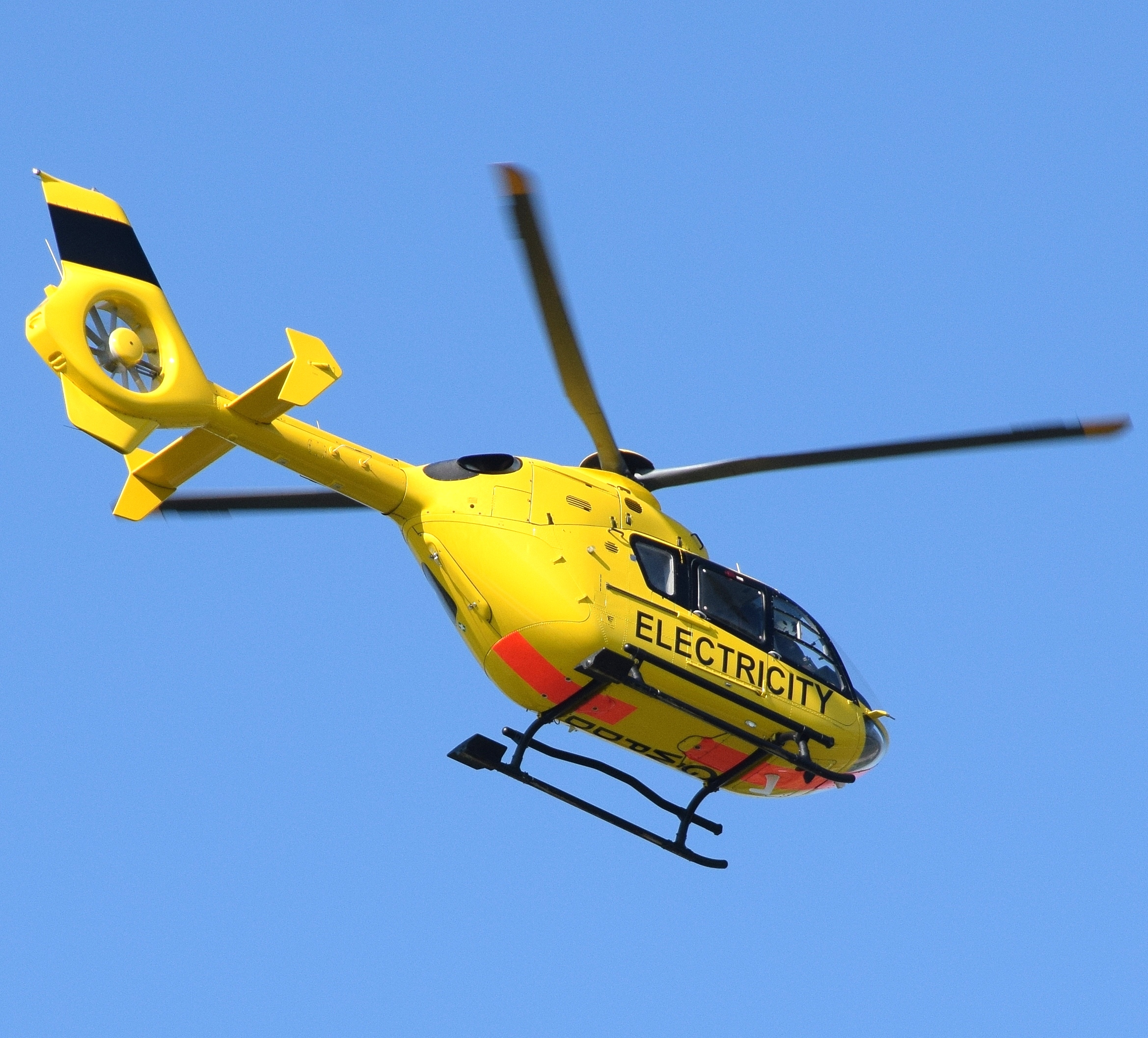
A EC135P1 of Western Power Distribution leaves Bristol Airport, 2016

In 2000, Eurocopter announced the start of certification work on the EC135P2, powered by the Pratt & Whitney Canada PW206B2, offering improved single-engine performance and 30-second emergency power. The Luftfahrt-Bundesamt certification was achieved in July 2001, and the first EC135 with the new engines was handed over to the Swedish Police Authority in August 2001. In September 2002, the EC135T2 equipped with the improved Turbomeca Arrius 2B2 was made available, providing for improved single-engine performance.

In 2002, the EC135 active control technology demonstrator/flying helicopter simulator (ACT/FHS), a research aircraft designed to test fibre optic-based flight control systems, undertook its first flight. In 2014, Airbus Helicopters began flying the Bluecopter demonstrator aircraft, built to explore more efficient design elements, including economy-optimised single-engine operations, Blue Edge swept rotor blades to reduce noise and increase efficiency, a relocated horizontal stabiliser outside the main rotor's downwash, an active rudder, and new water-based external paint; these changes were aimed at cutting fuel consumption by 40%. In December 2014, the single-engine operations portion of the Bluecopter tests were delayed to summer 2016 to make necessary avionics changes, such as to the engine's FADEC systems.

In March 2007, at the NBAA in Atlanta, Eurocopter unveiled 'L'Hélicoptère par Hermès, a special-edition VIP model designed by Hermès International, S.A. It features a customised luxury four-place main cabin, a sliding glass partition, a corporate baggage hold, redesigned skid landing gear and other external changes. The launch customer for the type is Falcon Aviation Services (FAS), based in Abu Dhabi, United Arab Emirates. In July 2014, Airbus Helicopters made further personalisation options available for the EC135 l'Helicoptere par Hermes.

In 2011, Eurocopter formalised a licence manufacturing agreement with Zhong-Ou International Group to produce the EC135 luxury helicopter in Zhejiang Province, China. In October 2015, a letter of intent between Airbus Helicopters and Ecopark was signed for the establishment of a final assembly line (FAL) in Qingdao Province, China. A related $1.1 billion order for 100 Chinese-assembled H135s was announced in the same month. The majority of assembly work on the type remains at Airbus Helicopter's Donauwörth facility. Construction of the FAL started in May 2017, and opened for production in April 2019.

In January 2016, the Ural Works of Civil Aviation (UWCA), a division of Rostec, signed an agreement to build the H135 under licence at the firm's facility in Yekaterinburg, Russia. In May 2016, it was reported that Russian production of the H135 was anticipated to begin in 2017, following the receipt of Russian type certification. Russian manufacturers may be incorporated in the global supply chain.

Two variants, the EC135 T3 and EC135 P3, were developed with improved high altitude and hover performance. Changes include repositioned air intakes to the engines, wider blades being installed on the main rotor, and changes to the fenstron anti-torque tail device. The EC135 T3 was introduced to service in December 2014.

In December 2020, the H135 helicopter family EASA has certified a new Alternate Gross Weight (AGW). With the new AGW, the maximum takeoff weight has been increased up to 265 lb (120 kg) and payload. This modification can be used to increase range by up to 75 nm or endurance by up to 40 minutes under standard conditions. The new AGW is available as an option and can be applied retroactively to all Helionix-equipped H135s.

In December 2020, Airbus certified a new single-pilot instrument flight rules Helionix cockpit for its H135 helicopters. The modified cockpit allows customers to choose whether to remove the copilot side of the instrument panel to increase the field of view or keep it to install specific STC equipment.

== Design ==
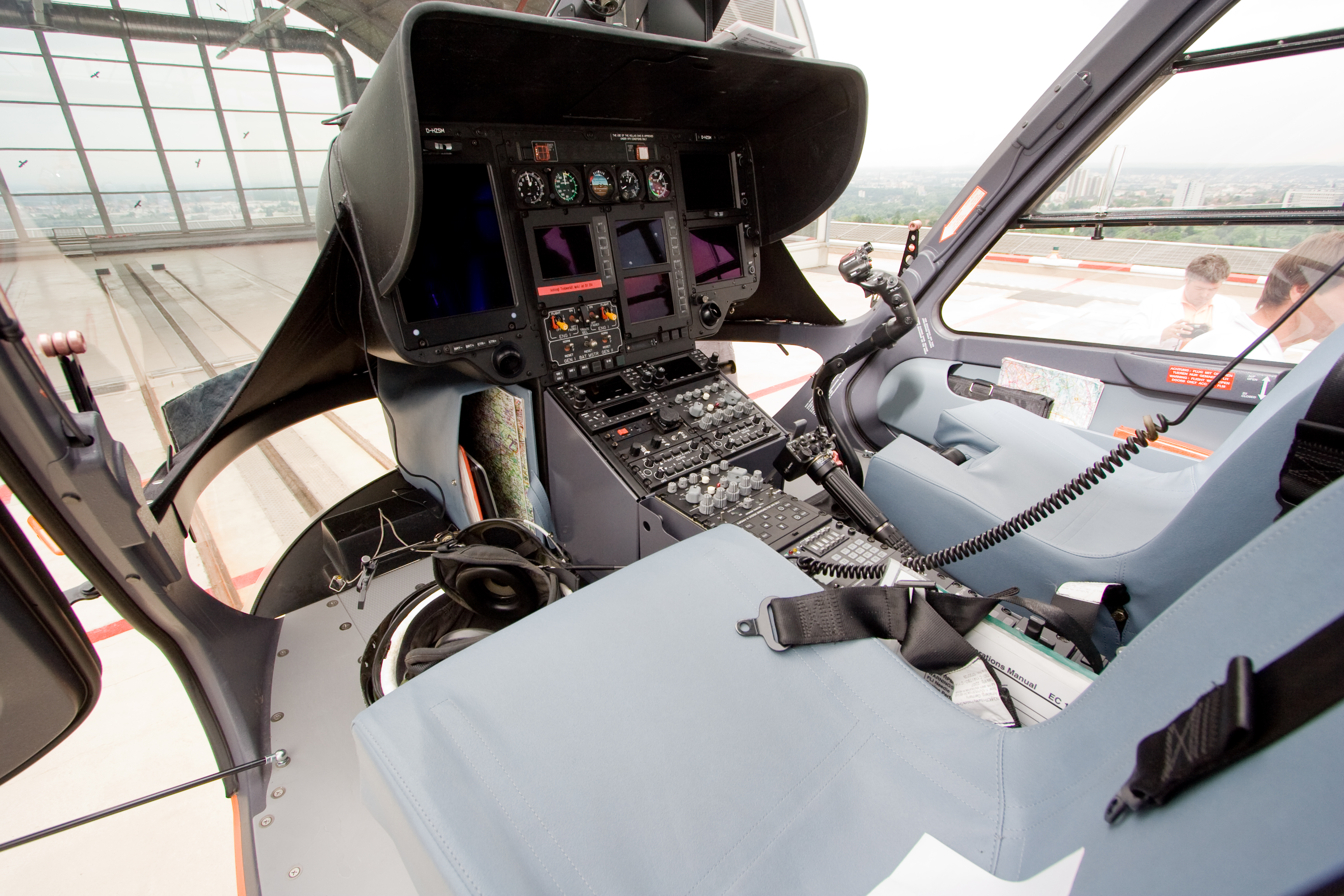
The cockpit of an EC135, May 2008

The H135 is a twin-engine rotorcraft. It can be alternatively powered by a pair of Turbomeca Arrius 2B or Pratt & Whitney Canada PW206B engines, dependent on customer's preference, which gives either a T or a P, respectively, in the variant name. The main rotor is of a four-bladed, bearingless fibre-composite design. Progressive improvements to the main rotor have increased its performance and reduced maintenance costs since the type's introduction. The EC135 is the quietest helicopter in its class, featuring an anti-resonance isolation system to dampen vibration from the main rotor. The type's Fenestron anti-torque device can be actively regulated via a HI NR rotor optimisation mode, which provides for greater controllability during higher weight take-off and landings. It is capable of performing Category A operations throughout its full flight envelope.

The EC135 can be equipped with either a conventional flight deck or the Avionique Novelle glass cockpit – the latter allows for single pilot instrument flight rules operation. The glass cockpit is equipped with several liquid-crystal displays, including two Sextant SMD45 displays and a central panel display. The main avionics suite is supplied by Thales Group. The EC135 can be outfitted with various avionics suites from manufacturers such as Russian firm Transas Aviation and British firm Britannia 2000.

The newer H135 model can be equipped with a four-axis autopilot, which is included as part of the Helionix avionics suite. This suite provides the H135 with a greater level of commonality with several other Airbus Helicopters-produced rotorcraft, including the H145, H160 and H175. Earlier versions of the EC135 were equipped with a three-axis autopilot with integrated stability augmentation, featuring a First Limit Indicator (FLI), simplifying engine and torque monitoring. Cockpit touch screens can be optionally installed.

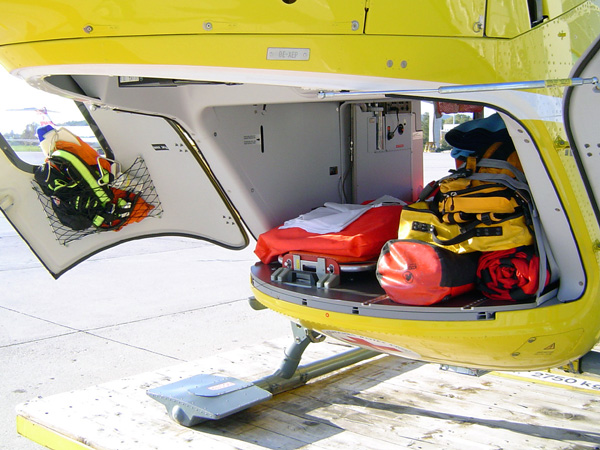
Clamshell rear doors on a EC135

Various cabin and cockpit configurations are available for the EC135, depending on the role performed and the operator's preferences. It can hold up to five passengers and a pilot when configured with a standard executive interior, or seven passengers in a dense corporate interior. Modular multi-role interiors that allow the main cabin area to be quickly changed and re-equipped are available. The main cabin of the EC135 is accessed either by large doors on either side of the cabin or by clamshell doors located at the rear of the cabin, directly underneath the aircraft's tail boom. The clamshell doors are particularly attractive to emergency medical services (EMS) and cargo operators.

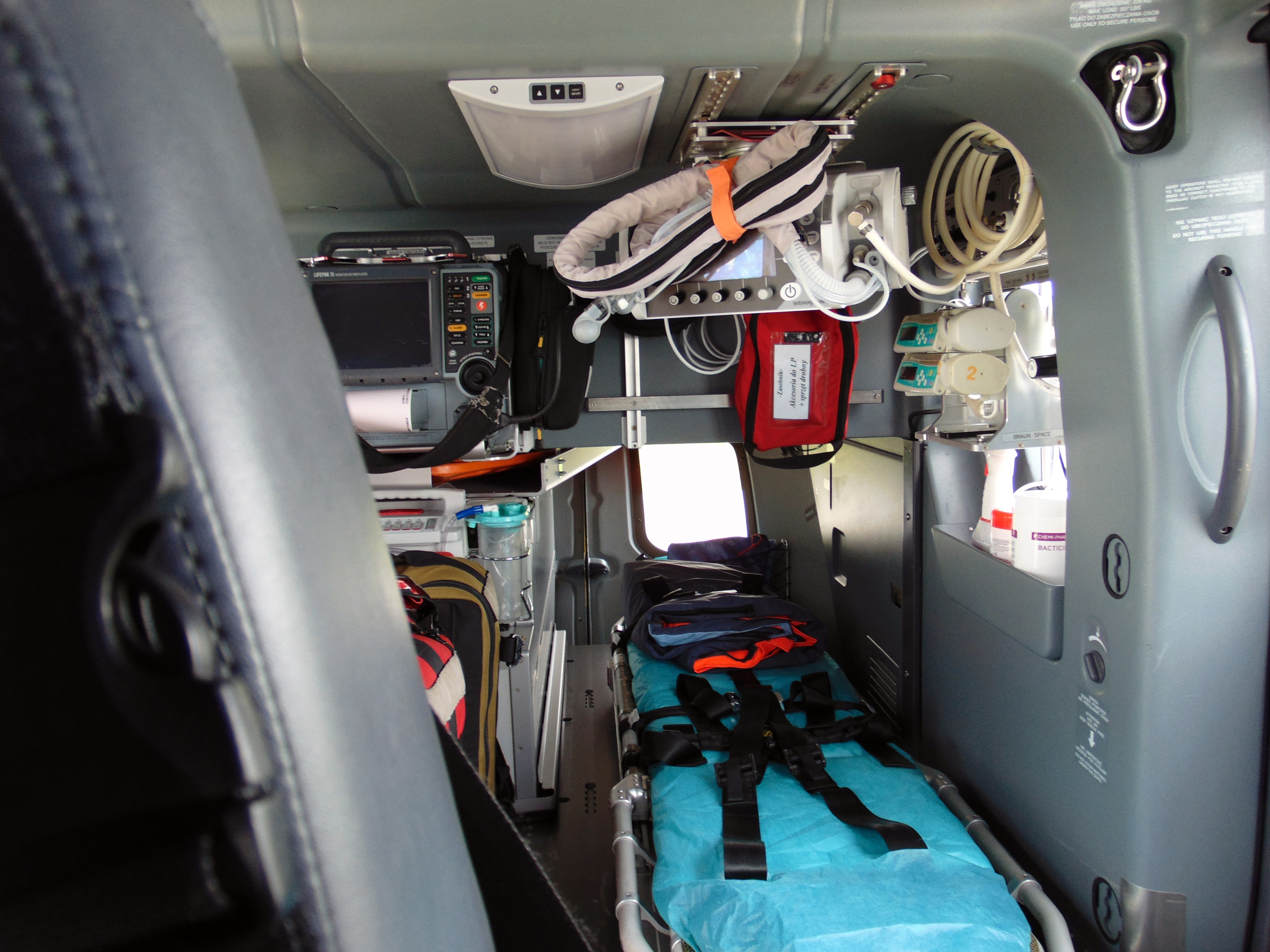
EC135 outfitted for medivac service

Medical facilities can be installed in the cabin, such as in-flight intensive care stations (including resuscitation functionality), incubators, and hygiene-convenient flooring. In a mountain rescue configuration, the cabin can simultaneously accommodate two stretchers as well as the pilot, anaesthetist, winch operator, mechanic and mountain rescue specialist.

Airbus Helicopters has promoted the airframe's various configurations as possessing "unique adaptability" for various missions, including utility work, commercial transportation, and training roles. Equipment for the law enforcement role include external loudspeakers, rappelling system, search lights with laser pointers, left or right-mounted hoists, and electro-optical sensors. For offshore oil & gas operations, the rotorcraft can be fitted with weather/search radars, emergency floatation aids, including an automated external life raft, energy-absorbent seating, class-D certified external hoists, and crash-resistant fuel tanks. An external hook can be installed to carry underslung loads of up to 272 kg for cargo missions. In a training capacity, features such a light aircraft recording system for post-flight analysis, intuitive human-machine interface, specific training modules, and a one-engine inoperative training mode, and full ground simulators, may be selected.

== Operational history ==
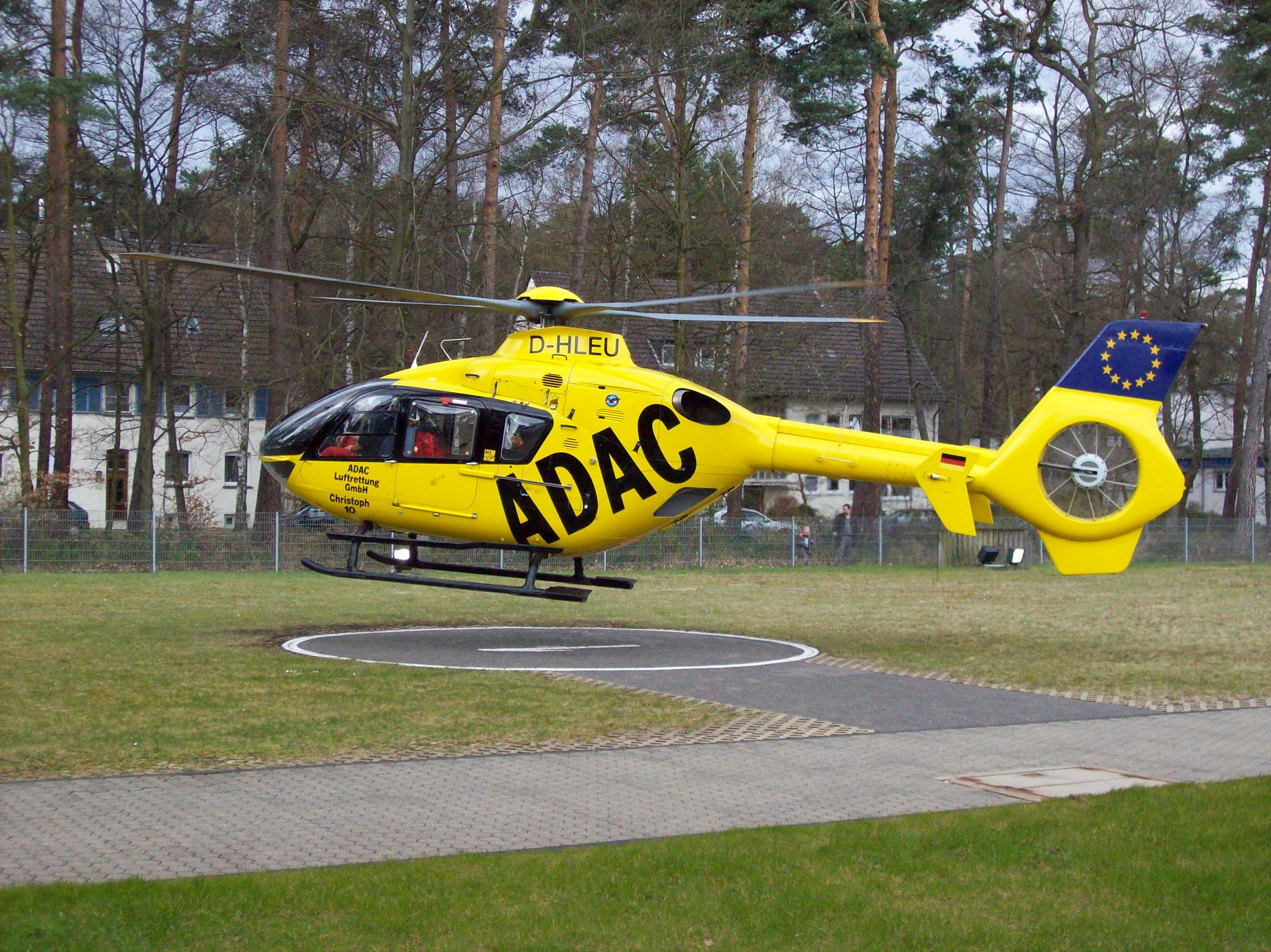
An ADAC EC135 taking off from Bonn University Clinic, 2008

Deliveries started in August 1996, when two helicopters, 0005 and 0006, were handed over to German emergency aero medical service provider Deutsche Rettungsflugwacht. The 100th EC135 was handed over to the Bavarian police force in June 1999, by which point the worldwide fleet had accumulated approximately 30,000 flight hours. In September 2003, the 300th EC135 was handed over to UK-based McAlpine Helicopters. At this point, the EC135 was the best selling new light twin-engine helicopter in the UK market.

In 2011, Eurocopter announced that the 1,000th EC135 to be produced had been delivered to German operator ADAC, roughly 15 years since the start of production. In 2012, Flying magazine recognised the EC135 as being "the industry's best selling twin-engine helicopter". The world fleet leader in flight hours for the type is G-NESV (s/n 0067), operated by Cleveland Police Air Operations Unit based at Durham Tees Valley Airport, UK. Originally delivered to the North East Air Support Unit in April 1999, it was the first EC135 worldwide to attain 10,000 flying hours.

In 2009, the EC135 was the first aircraft selected for offshore wind support in the UK, after the Civil Aviation Authority approved helicopter operations to the Greater Gabbard offshore wind farm. The EC135 has been used in Denmark to support the Horns Rev offshore wind farm. By 2013, over 10,000 successful personnel transfers have taken place using the type. In Mexico, Apoyo Logístico Aéreo has operated a fleet of EC135s for servicing the extensive oil and gas offshore platforms in the Gulf of Mexico.

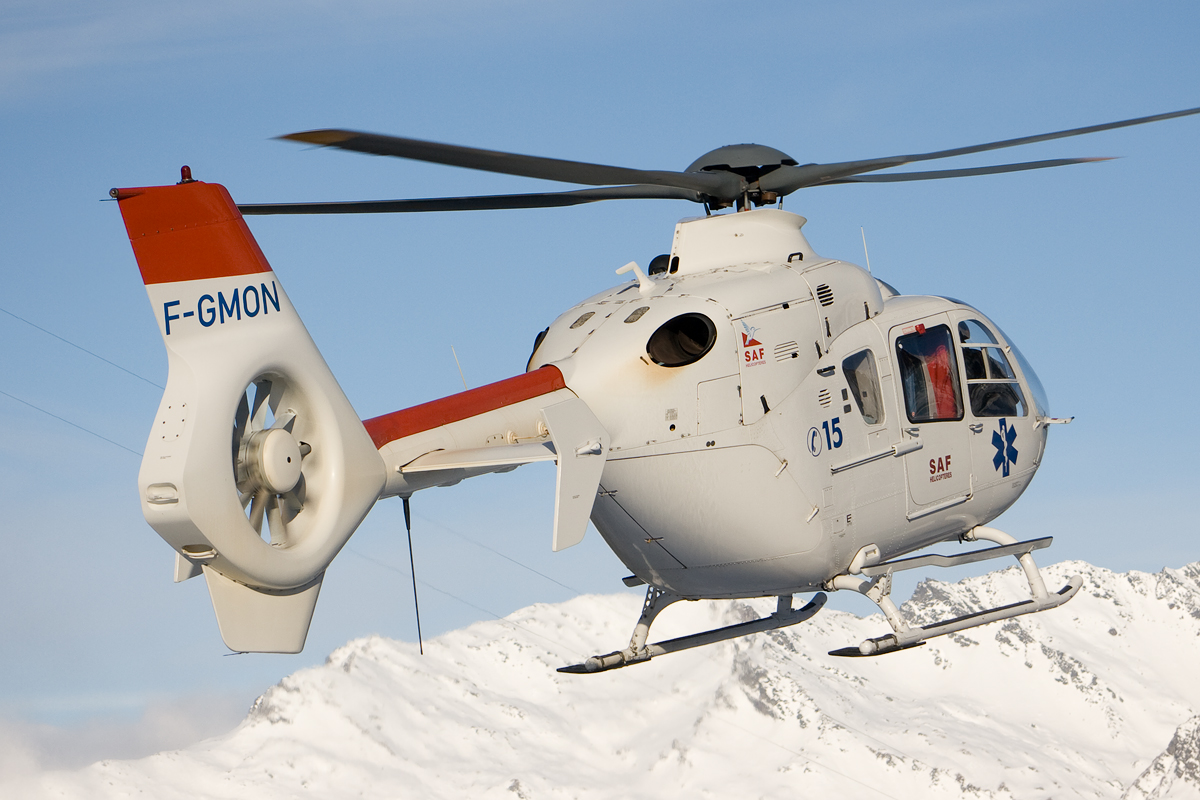
An EC135 T1 of French operator SAF Hélicoptères

In 2013, it was reported that the EC135 was currently providing roughly 25% of the world's total emergency medic services flights, and that over 500 EC135s have been delivered to in an aeromedical configuration. By late 2013, during which a brief grounding of the type was instigated due to safety concerns of fuel gauges, the EC135 made up half of the UK's operational air ambulance fleet. In October 2014, the first EC135 air ambulance was delivered in the Chinese market.

The German Army operates 19 H135s as basic trainers at the School of Army Aviation in Bückeburg. These have had an average operational availability in excess of 95 per cent. In 2014, the German Army noted that there was potential for vibration-induced rotor cracking during autorotation training, shortening the life of the main rotor. 13 EC135 trainers have been procured by the Japanese Maritime Self-Defense Force, they have been designed as the TH-135.

In December 2014, the first production EC135 T3 entered service with Aiut Alpin Dolomites, a mountain rescue operator based in Italy. In June 2015, Airbus Helicopters delivered the first retrofitted H135 from the earlier EC135 standard. Changes include an enlarged main rotor, relocated engine air intakes, elevated engine performance, and the horizontal stabiliser's endplates removed and its span increased.

In October 2015, Waypoint Leasing and Airbus Helicopters signed an agreement for the acquisition of up to 20 H135 for public leasing purposes.

In 2017, the Royal Air Force received the first 2 of 29 H135s designated as Juno HT.1s for the UK Military Flying Training System with training provided by Ascent Flight Training.

In 2018, the Australian Defence Force established the Joint Helicopter School operating 15 EC135T2+ procured under Project Air 9000 Phase 7 to train both Australian Army and Royal Australian Navy pilots. The school is set within Navy's 723 Squadron at HMAS Albatross. In 2024, after the retirement of the MRH-90 Taipan helicopter, the Australian government announced that it would lease 5 H135T3 (Juno) from the United Kingdom Ministry of Defence for five years to maintain "essential training requirements" for Australian Army pilots. The helicopters will be based at the Oakey Army Aviation Centre.

== Variants ==
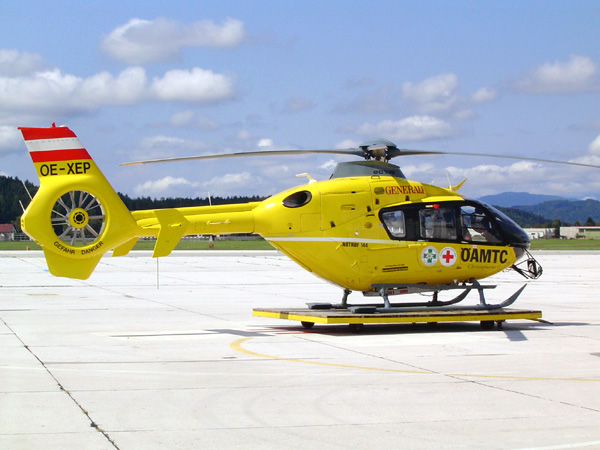
EC135 T2 air ambulance of the Austrian Air Rescue service

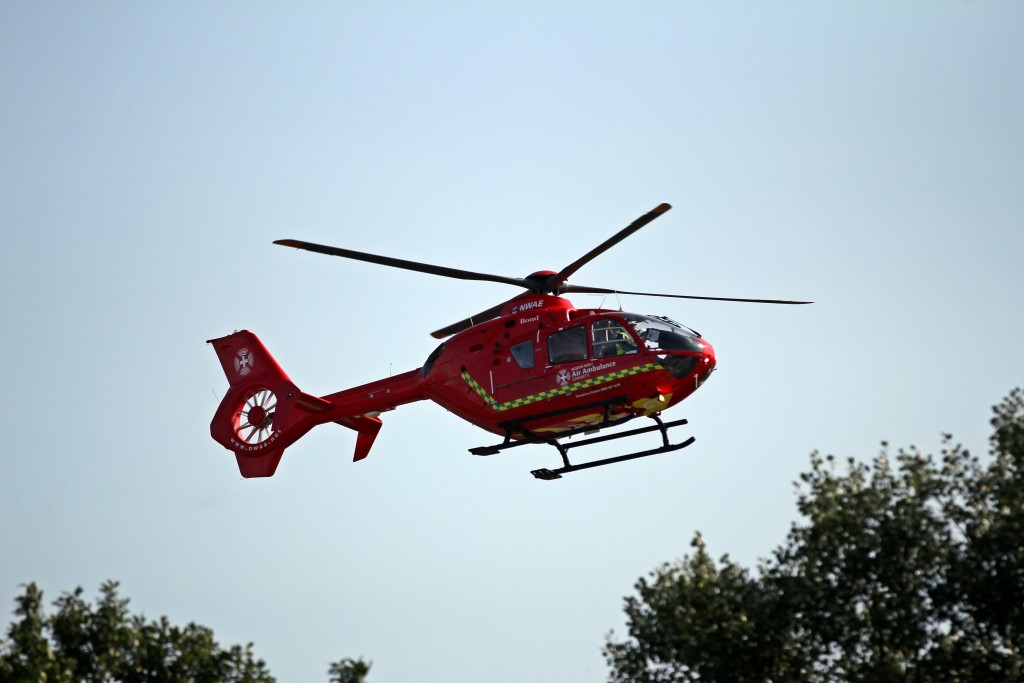
One of the North West Air Ambulance's three EC135T2

EC135 P1
Powered by two 463 kW (621 shp) Pratt & Whitney Canada PW206B (ratings correspond to take-off power (TOP)). Later versions have the centre panel display system (CPDS). Initial maximum take-off weight (M.T.O.W.) of 2,630 kg (5,798 lbs), later raised to 2,720 kg (5,997 lbs) and then 2,835 kg (6,250 lbs).
EC135 T1
Powered by two 435 kW (583 shp)(TOP rating) Turbomeca Arrius 2B1/2B1A/2B1A1. Later versions have the CPDS. Initial M.T.O.W. of 2,630 kg (5,798 lbs), later raised to 2,720 kg (5,997 lbs) and then 2,835 kg (6,250 lbs).
EC135 P2
Powered by two 463 kW (621 shp) (TOP rating) Pratt & Whitney Canada PW206B2. Increased thermodynamic and mechanic OEI ratings (128% OEI torque). Replaced EC135 P1 in production in August 2001.
EC135 T2
Powered by two 452 kW (606 shp) (TOP rating) Turbomeca Arrius 2B2. Increased thermodynamic and mechanic OEI ratings (128% OEI torque). Replaced EC135 T1 in production in August 2002.
EC135 P2+ (Marketing name EC135 P2i)
Latest current production version with 498 kW (667 shp) PW206B2 (new power ratings based on a FADEC software upgrade), plus a 2,910 kg (6,415 lbs) M.T.O.W. upgrade, extended component time between overhauls (TBOs), and a change in the main transmission lubricating oil. Built in Germany and Spain.
EC135 T2+ (Marketing name EC135 T2i)
Latest current production version with 473 kW (634 shp) Arrius 2B2 engines (new power ratings based on a FADEC software upgrade), plus a 2,910 kg (6,415 lbs) M.T.O.W. upgrade, extended component TBOs, and a change in the main transmission lubricating oil. Built in Germany and Spain.
EC135 P2+ (Marketing name EC135 P2e)
Marketing designation of aircraft with increased M.T.O.W. of 2,950 kg (6,504 lbs) within restricted flight envelope.
EC135 T2+ (Marketing name EC135 T2e)
Marketing designation of aircraft with increased M.T.O.W. of 2,950 kg (6,504 lbs) within restricted flight envelope.
EC135 P3
Powered by two 528 kW (708 shp) (TOP rating) PW206B3 engines (new power ratings based on a FADEC software upgrade), plus a 2,980 kg (6,570 lbs) M.T.O.W. upgrade, and significant increased OEI, Cat A, and hot/high performance. Market introduction in 2014.
H135 (EC135 T3)
Powered by two 492 kW (660 shp) (TOP rating) Arrius 2B2Plus engines (new power ratings based on a FADEC software upgrade), plus a 2,980 kg (6,570 lbs) M.T.O.W. upgrade, and significant increased OEI, Cat A, and hot/high performance. Market introduction in 2014.
EC635/H135M
Military variant originally developed to meet a Portuguese Army requirement for a fire support and medical evacuation helicopter. Presently, operated by Jordan, Swiss and Iraqi armed forces.
TH-135
Military training variant developed from the EC135 T2+.
ACH135
Corporate variant of the H135.
VH-35
Brazilian Air Force designation for a VIP transport variant of the EC135.
H.13
(Thai: ฮ.๑๓) Royal Thai Armed Forces designation for the H135.

== Operators ==
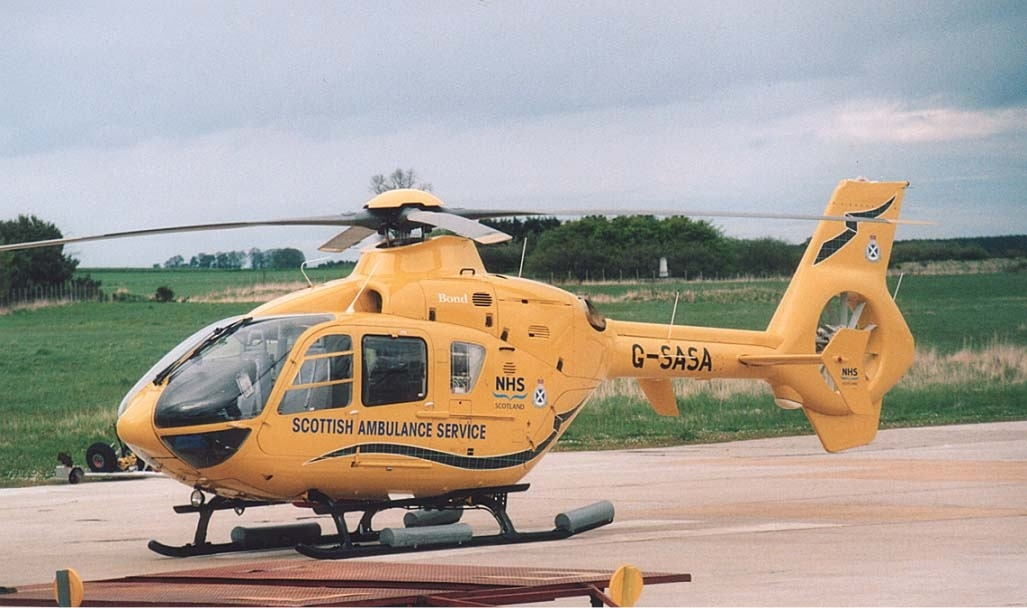
A Scottish Ambulance Service Eurocopter EC-135T

In 2016, half of the EC135s operating in service were engaged in emergency medical services operations, 17% in air transport, 16% in public services (typically law enforcement), 10% in military missions, 4% in offshore operations (typically offshore wind power inspection), and the remaining 3% in military training.

The 1,400th was delivered in September 2020, as over 300 customers in 60 countries accumulated more than 4.5 million flight hours. Most are in Europe (641), followed by North America (316) and Asia (195).

=== Military operators ===
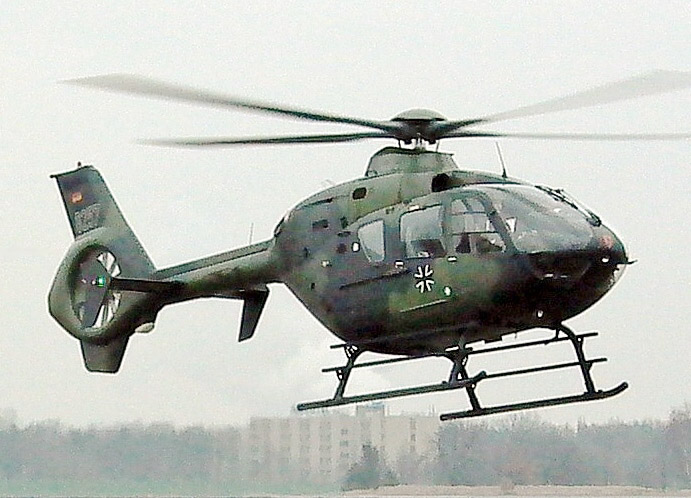
An EC135 T1 of the German Army

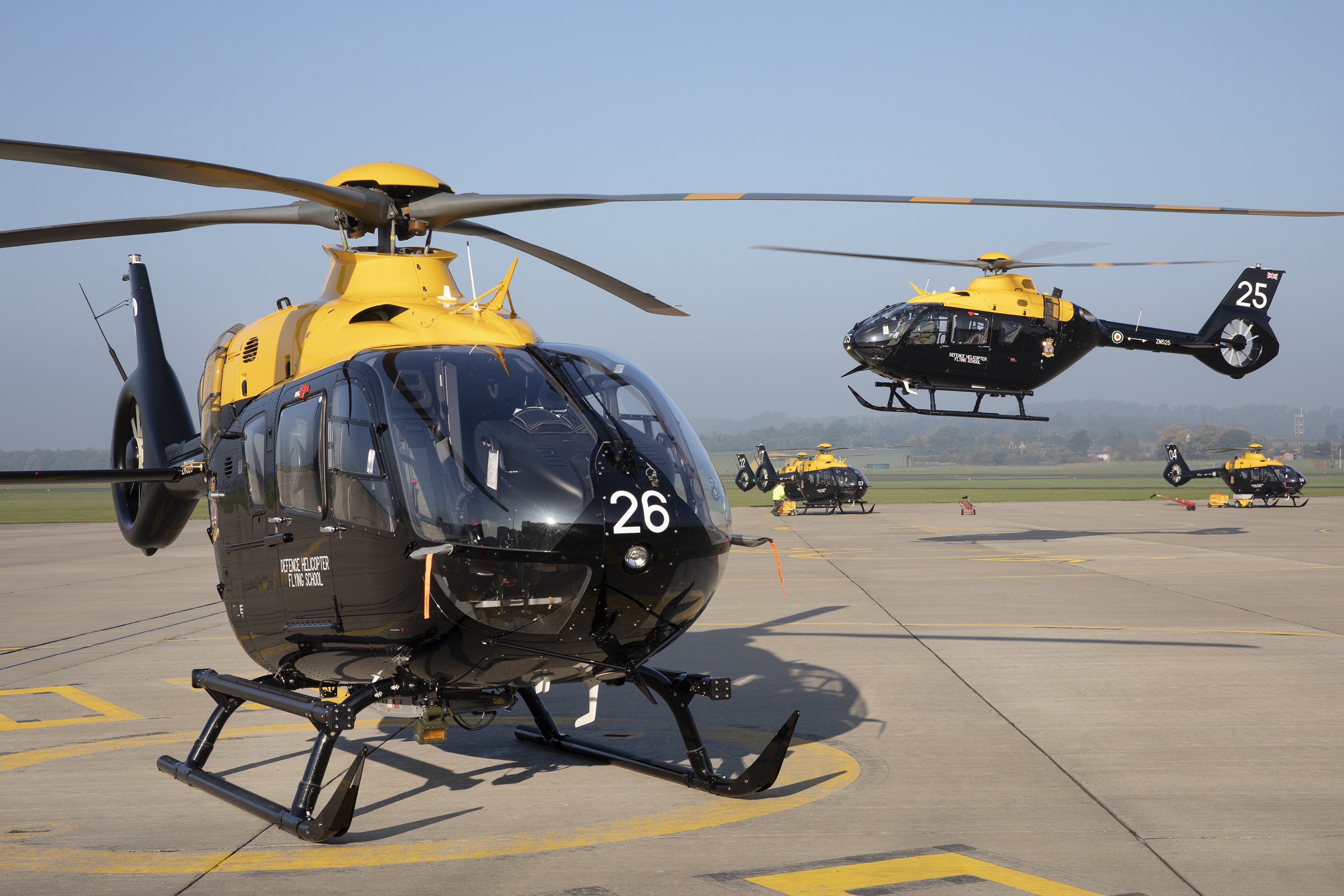
The EC135T3 designated as the Juno HT1 in RAF service

Australia

- Royal Australian Navy - 15 EC135T2+
- Australian Army - 5 EC135 T3 to be leased from the UK Ministry of Defence

Brazil

- Brazilian Air Force
- Brazilian Navy - 3 EC135 T3 ordered to replace AS355F2.

Canada

- Royal Canadian Air Force - 19 helicopters are to be acquired for pilot training. The helicopters are to be built at Airbus Helicopters' facility in Fort Erie, Canada with deliveries starting 2026. The aircraft are to be named the CT-153 Juno in RCAF service.

Gabon

- Gabonese Air Force

Germany

- German Army

Iraq

- Iraqi Army Aviation Command - 20

Ireland

- Irish Air Corps

Japan

- Japan Maritime Self-Defense Force

Morocco

- Royal Moroccan Air Force - H135s ordered for training duties in 2022.
- Royal Moroccan Gendarmerie

Nigeria

- Nigerian Air Force

Spain

- Spanish Army Airmobile Force

United Kingdom

- Royal Air Force / Ascent Flight Training - No. 1 Flying Training School

=== Government operators ===
Argentina

- Argentine Federal Police
- Argentine National Gendarmerie

Austria

- Federal Police

Bosnia and Herzegovina

- Ministry of Internal Affairs ZDK - contracted a purchase of 1 H135 Airbus model in August 2025.

Brazil

- Military Police of São Paulo State

Canada

- Durham Regional Police - 1 helicopter purchased in 2024
- Halton Regional Police - 1 helicopter purchased in 2024
- Ontario Provincial Police - 3 helicopters purchased in 2024 for use in the Greater Toronto Area, Ottawa, and Thunder Bay., plus an additional 2 helicopters previously purchased in 2011.
- Peel Regional Police - 1 helicopter purchased in 2024

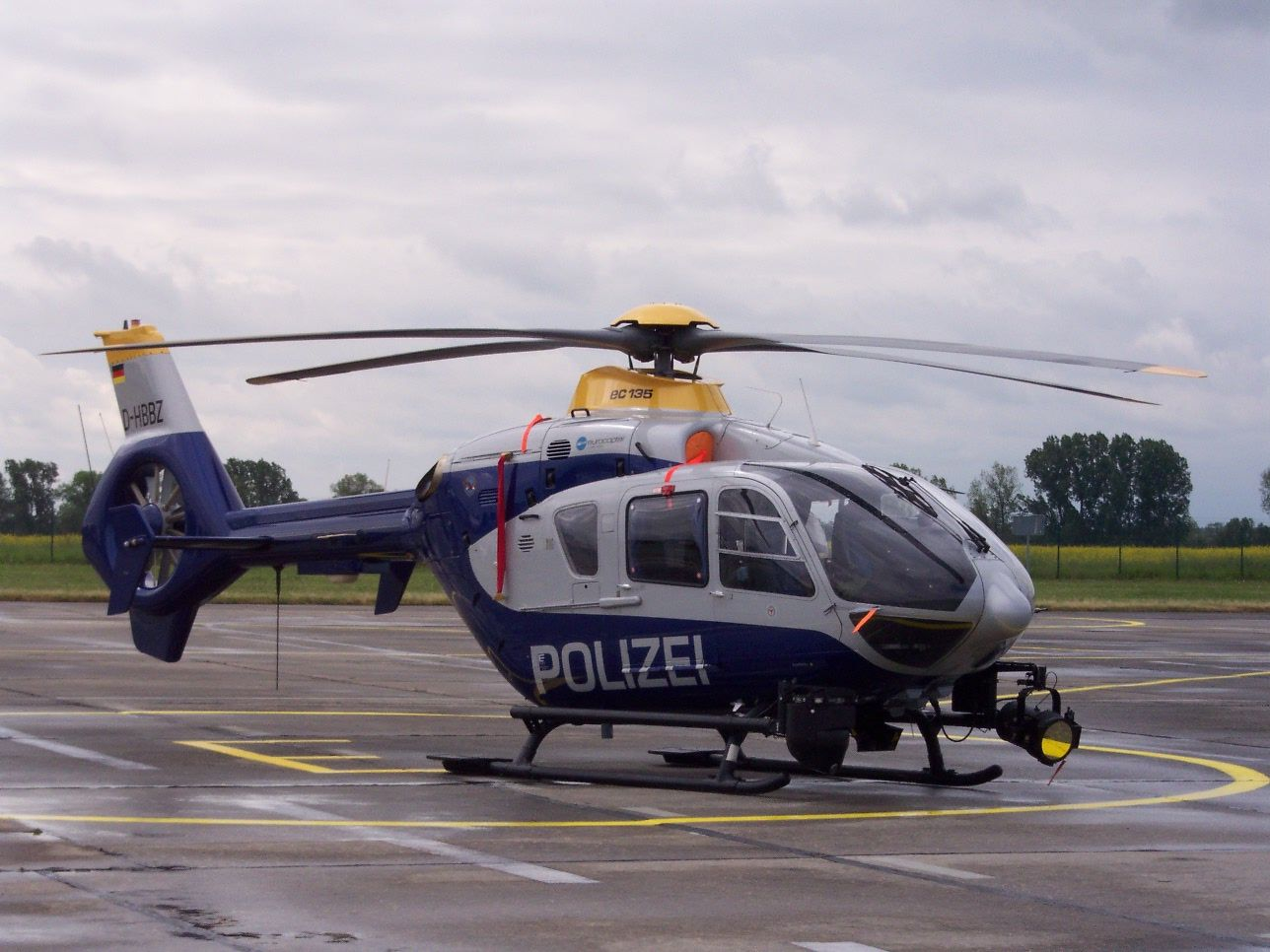
An EC135 of the German Brandenburg State Police

Chile

- Carabineros de Chile

China

- Guangdong Provincial Public Security Department
- Shanghai Municipal Public Security Bureau

Croatia

- Croatian Police

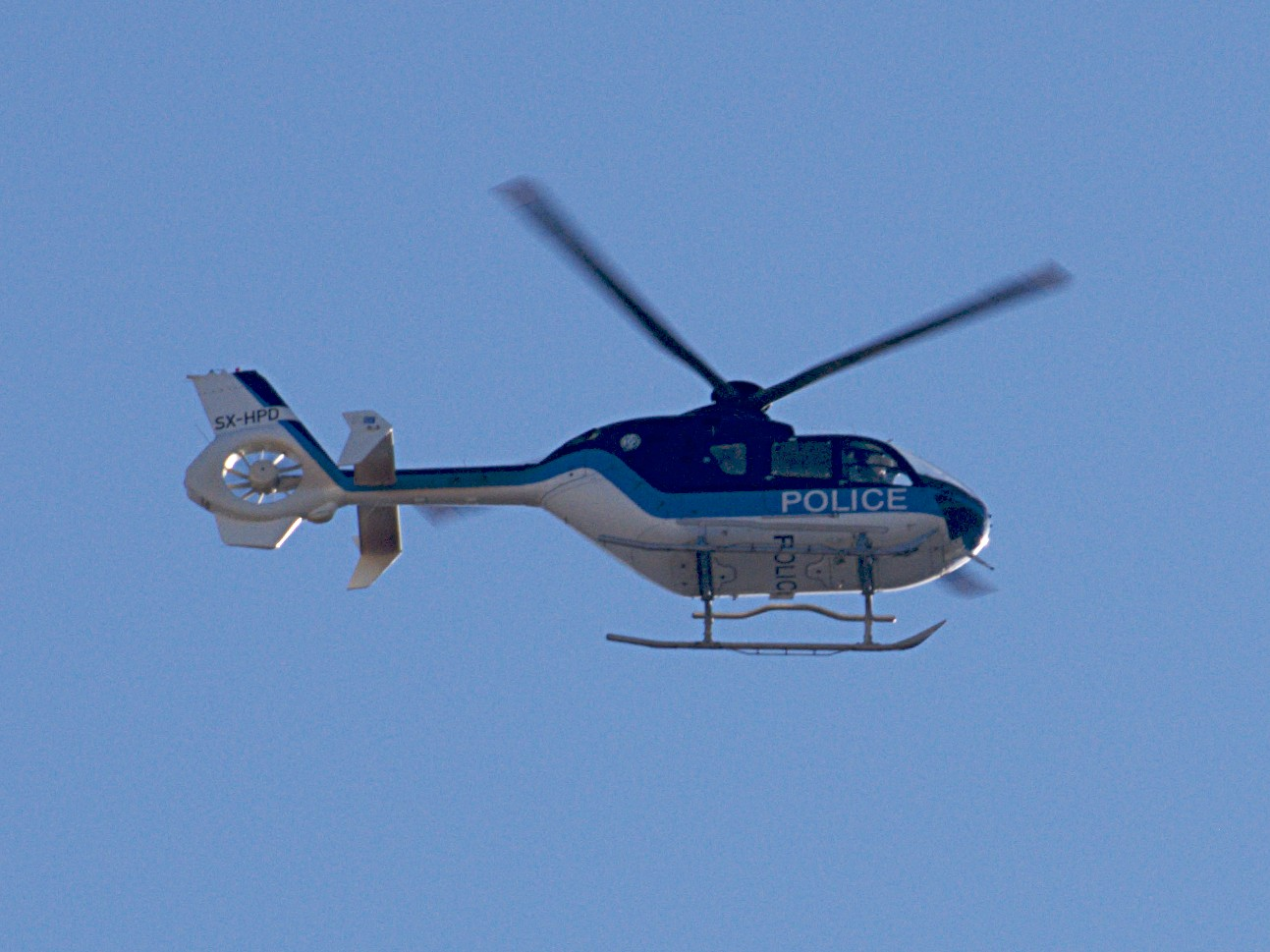
An EC-135T1 of the Greek police

Czech Republic

- State Police

Germany

- Federal Police
- State Police

Greece

- Hellenic Police Aviation Division

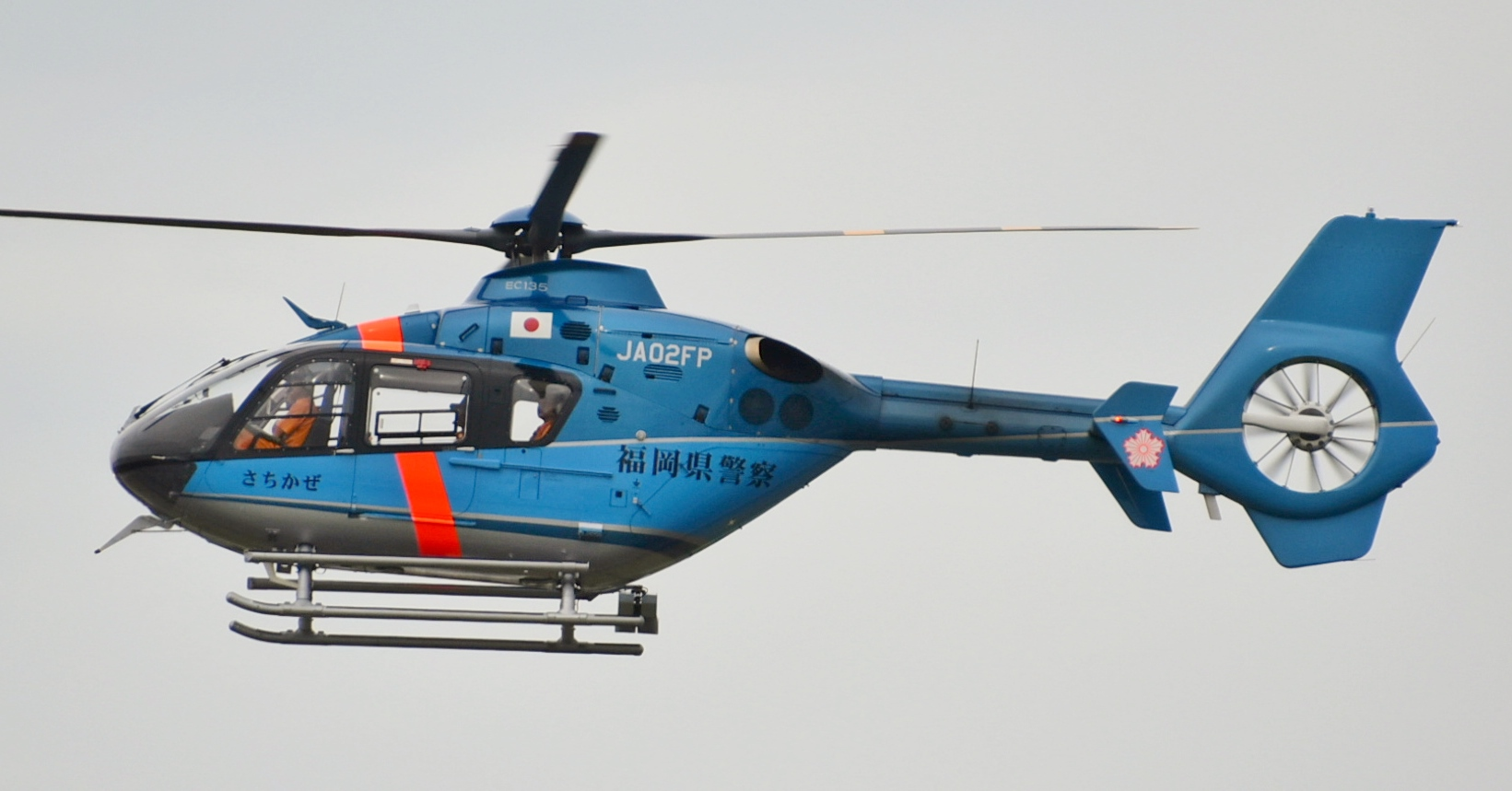
A Japanese National Police EC-135

Hungary

- National Ambulance Service (Országos Mentőszolgálat)

Ireland

- Garda Air Support Unit

Japan

- Japanese National Police

Lithuania

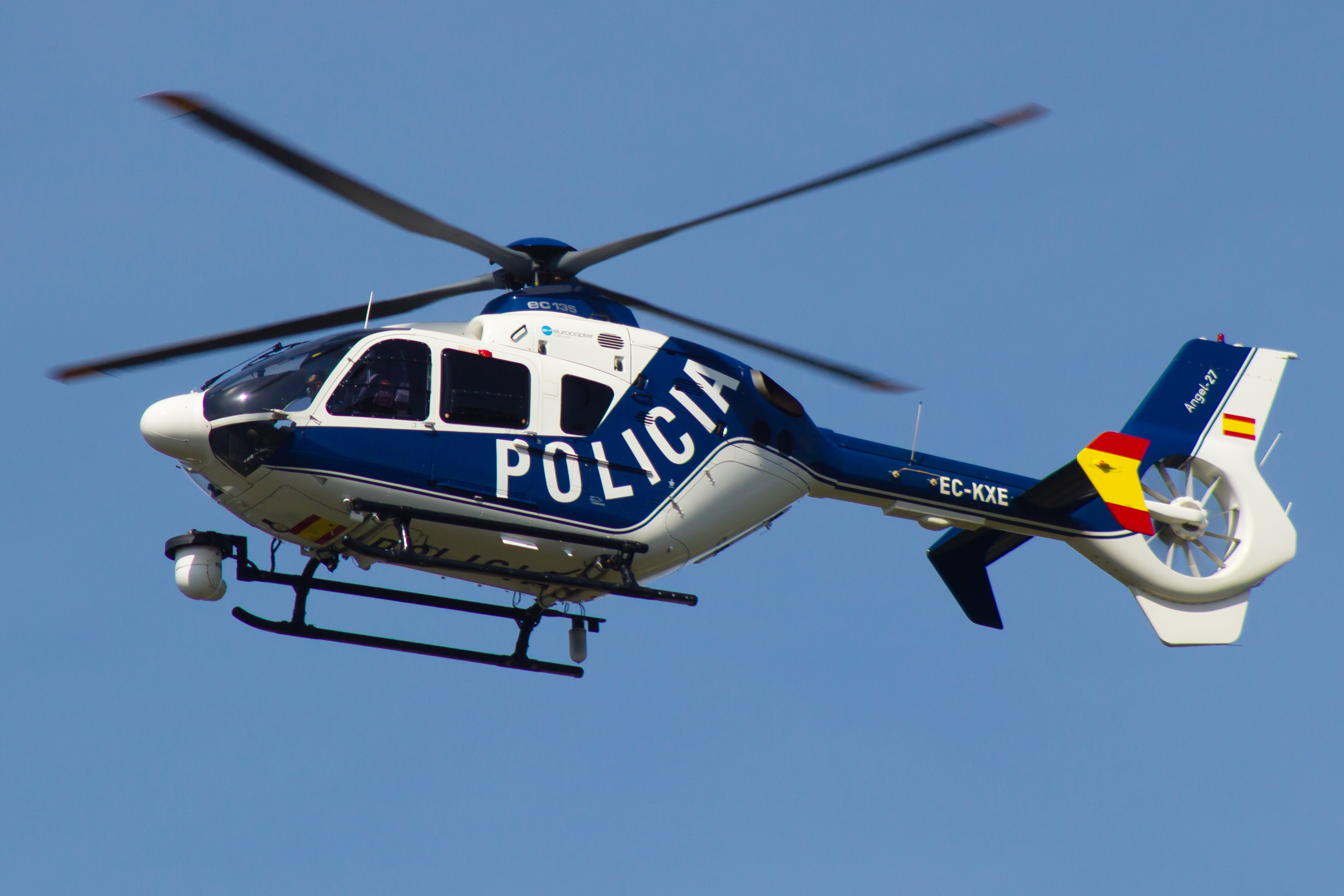
An EC135P2+ of the National Police of Spain

- State Border Guard

Netherlands

- Dutch National Police
- ANWB Medical Air Assistance

Norway

- Norwegian Police Service - The EC135 was used til it was replaced by AW169 in 2019.

Poland

- Medical Air Rescue
- Border Guard (Poland)

Romania

- Romanian Police
- SMURD

Slovenia

- Slovenian National Police

Spain

- Civil Guard
- National Police Corps

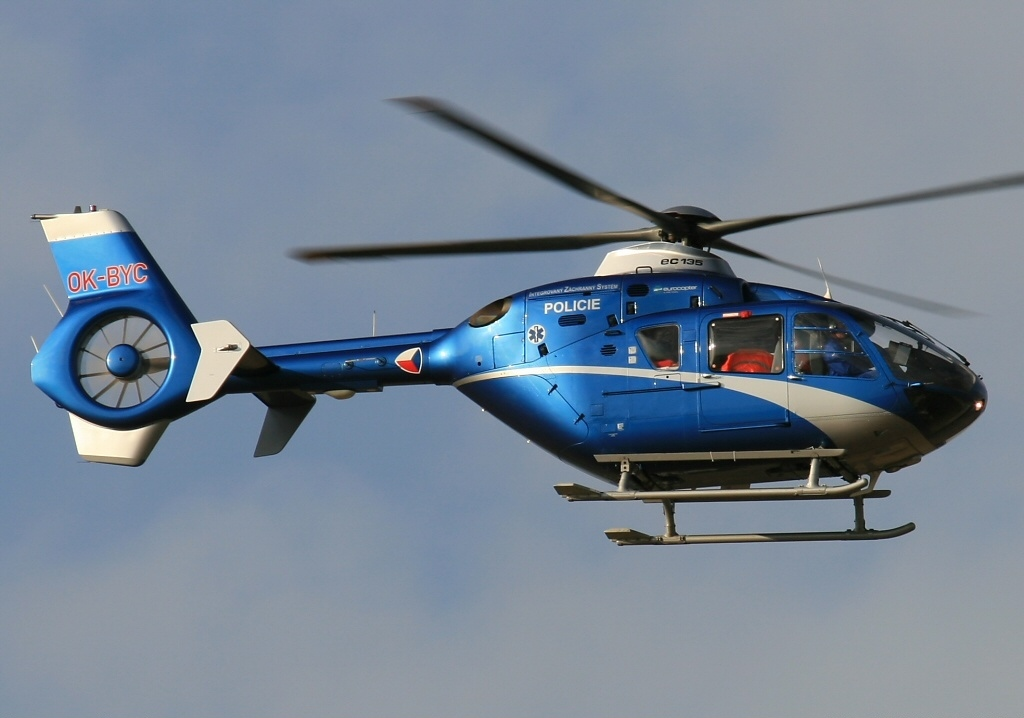
An EC135T2 of the Czech Police

United Kingdom

- Northern Lighthouse Board
- National Police Air Service (England & Wales)
- Police Scotland
- Trinity House

Turkey

- Ministry of Health (Turkey) (operated by Turkish Aeronautical Association)

United States

- Broward County Sheriff
- Massachusetts State Police

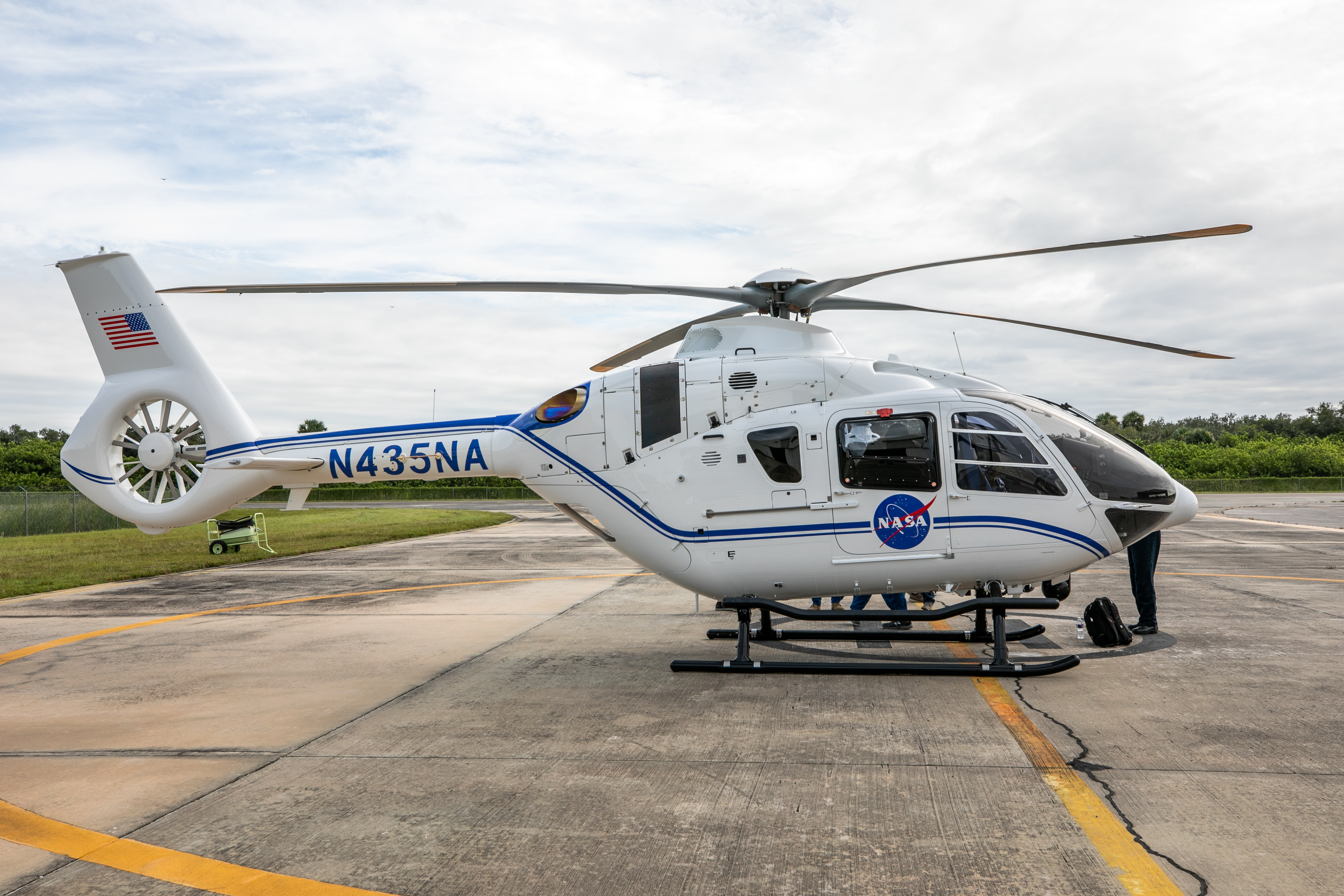
NASA Airbus Helicopters H135

- NASA

== Accidents and incidents ==
- On 29 November 2013, a Police Scotland EC135 T2 crashed into a pub in Glasgow, Scotland. Three occupants of the aircraft were killed, as well as seven patrons of the pub. The UK AAIB issued its final report on the accident on 23 October 2015. It said that "No significant pre-impact technical defect was identified in any part of the aircraft or its systems." It added that important fuel transfer pumps were switched off "for unknown reasons", and that the helicopter "did not land within the 10-minute period specified in the Pilot's Checklist Emergency and Malfunction Procedures, following continuous activation of the low fuel warnings, for unknown reasons."
- On 14th March 2018, an EC135 Callsign VH-ZGA crashed into the sea during a Marine Pilot Transfer (MPT) landing attempt on a bulk carrier ship named ‘Squireship’ approximately 20 nautical miles off the coast of Port Hedland, Australia. The helicopter pilot was under supervision by a senior pilot and was attempting a night landing on the vessel to collect a Marine Pilot who had been piloting the vessel. The rate of descent was excessive and despite a go-around attempt the helicopter impacted the sea surface, and immediately capsized. One pilot was able to escape through a hole in the windscreen and survived, while the other pilot could not escape the cockpit and did not survive.
- On 28 August 2023, a Broward Sheriff's Office EC135 crashed into a residential building, after witnesses stated it started smoking heavily while in flight before spinning and rapidly losing altitude. A Broward Sheriff Fire Rescue Captain, and a resident of the structure that the helicopter crashed into, were both killed in the crash. Two other employees, and a second resident survived.

== Specifications (EC135 P2+/T2+) ==

External videos
- An EC135 Landing on a yacht
- Pair of medical EC135s in formation flight
- EC135 P-2+ performing a flight demonstration

Data from Eurocopter EC135 2008 Tech Data book

General characteristics

- Crew: 1 pilot
- Capacity: up to seven passengers or two crew and two patients (air ambulance variant) or 1,455 kg (3,208 lb) payload
- Length: 10.2 m (33 ft 6 in)
- Height: 3.51 m (11 ft 6 in)
- Empty weight: 1,455 kg (3,208 lb)
- Max takeoff weight: 2,910 kg (6,415 lb)
- Powerplant: 2 × Turbomeca Arrius 2B2 turboshaft engines, 472 kW (633 hp) each
  or 2 × Pratt & Whitney Canada PW206B turboshaft engines rated at 463 kW (621 hp) (take-off power)
- Main rotor diameter: 10.2 m (33 ft 6 in)
- Main rotor area: 81.7 m^{2} (879 sq ft)

Performance

- Cruise speed: 254 km/h (158 mph, 137 kn)
- Never exceed speed: 287 km/h (178 mph, 155 kn)
- Range: 635 km (395 mi, 343 nmi)
- Service ceiling: 6,096 m (20,000 ft)
- Rate of climb: 7.62 m/s (1,500 ft/min)

== See also ==
Related development

- MBB Bo 105
- Eurocopter EC145
- Eurocopter EC635
- Airbus Helicopters H140

Aircraft of comparable role, configuration, and era

- AgustaWestland AW109
- Bell 427
- Bell 429 GlobalRanger
- Eurocopter AS350 Écureuil
- Eurocopter AS355 Écureuil 2
- MD Helicopters MD Explorer
- MBB/Kawasaki BK 117
- HAL Dhruv
- HAL Light Utility Helicopter

Related lists

- List of rotorcraft
- List of most-produced rotorcraft
