= Iraqi Army Aviation Command =

- قيادة طيران الجيش العراقي
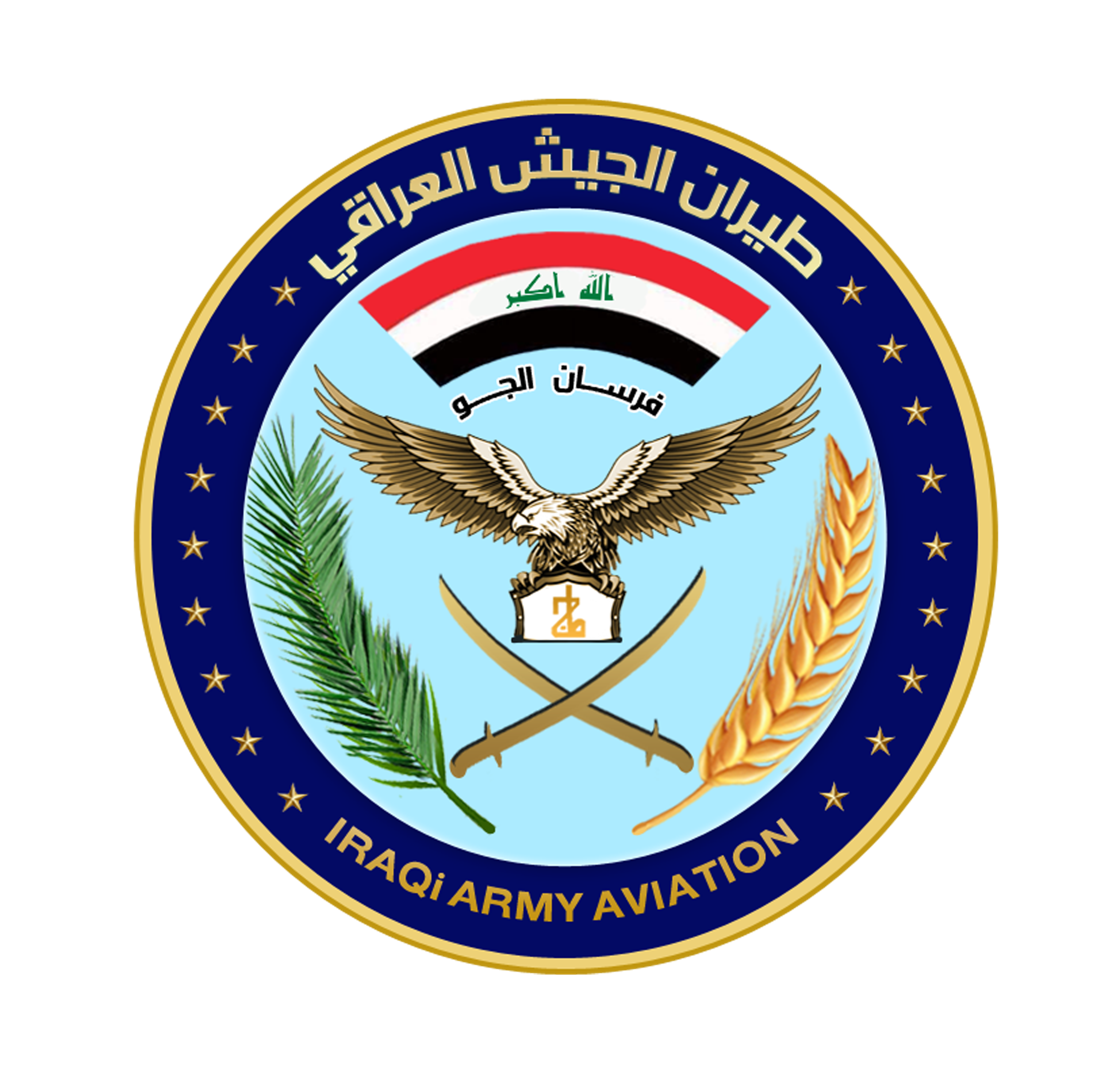
- Iraqi Army Aviation Insigna
- Active: 26 June 1980; 46 years ago
- Country: Iraq
- Type: Army Aviation
- Role: Tactical and logistical support of ground units
- Part of: Iraqi Armed Forces
- Command Headquarters: Baghdad
- Equipment: Helicopters; UAVs
- Engagements: Iran–Iraq War; Invasion of Kuwait; Gulf War; Operation Southern Watch; Iraqi no-fly zones; Iraq War; War against Islamic State; Syrian Civil War

Commanders
- Current commander: Lieutenant General Pilot Aqeel Mustafa Mahdi

Insignia
- Country Flag

Iraqi Armed Forces Roundel used on Iraqi Army Aviation Helicopters

The Iraqi Army Aviation Command is the aviation branch of the Iraqi Ground Forces founded in 1980. It commands the helicopter class as well as the class of unmanned aerial vehicles (UAVs). It is a completely separate force from the Iraqi Air Force, and its current commander is LT. Gen. Aqeel Mustafa Mahdi.

== History ==
=== Origination Of Aviation Command ===
The Iraqi Army Aviation Command was formed after a split from the Iraqi Air Force in 1980.

=== The 1990s ===
After Iraq's military was destroyed in the Gulf War, and the Army Aviation Command lost much of its equipment in military operations. After the war, Iraq was unable to rebuild to its previous state of military power as a result of the United Nations' decision to blockade Iraq.

=== After 2003 ===
After the United States and its allies invaded Iraq in 2003 and the civil administrator Paul Bremer, decided to dissolve and rehabilitate the Iraqi army. The Army Aviation Command was dissolved and most of the military, logistical equipment and infrastructure was dismantled.

Initially all helicopters in the new Iraqi Armed Forces post-2003 were operated by the Iraqi Air Force. The United States began rebuilding the support helicopter capability and supplied it with the necessary military equipment, logistics and rehabilitation of army bases and airports. In October 2010, a number of helicopters were transferred from the Air Force to the Army, and the Iraqi Army Aviation Command was reformed.

The U.S. Army Corps of Engineers began construction of a very large maintenance building for the IAAC in 2009, costing $9.8 million. The Iraqi Army Aviation Command held a ribbon cutting ceremony at Taji on 17 January 2011 to formally begin operations in their newest maintenance facility. The hangar was large enough for aviation mission requirements at the time, and growing requirements projected into the future. At more than 240 feet long and 50 feet tall, the hangar was the largest maintenance hangar in Iraq and the largest clear-span building in the entire Middle East. The hangar bay was large enough to support multiple airframes and activities that have a logical work flow relationship simultaneously. It was part of a larger complex that includes numerous offices and maintenance shops.

== Organization ==
=== Command ===
The Army Aviation Command Headquarters is located in Baghdad, Iraq.

=== Academies and training centers ===
Army Aviation College

The College of Aviation is one of the formations of the Army Aviation Command. The college habilitates, prepares and trains pilots in various specialized and military theory and skills, including navigation, flight theories, air conditioning, the English language, communications and various military lessons in order to prepare them to work in all squadrons and air bases and to continue performing their tasks in combating terrorism and defending Iraq. The college consists of five wings: Aviation, Teaching, Technical, Administration, supplies and Military Training.

=== Bases and airports ===
The Army Aviation Command uses military bases and airports scattered throughout Iraq.

== Personnel ==
=== Army Aviation Command Commanders ===
Military Rank	Name	Duration
Lieutenant General Pilot	Hamed Atiya Al-Maliki	2005-2020
Lieutenant General Pilot	Samir Zaki Husayn Al-Maliki	2020-2024
Major General Pilot	Muhammad Abdul-Karim Aouni	2024-2026
Lieutenant General Pilot	Aqeel Mustafa Mahdi	2026-present

=== Ranks ===
The ranks of the army aviation force are the same as the standard armed forces ranks. Because the army's flight force is derived from the air force, it inherited the ranks of the air force and comes with epaulets of sky-blue color and below the epaulettes are two wings of an eagle (indicating the pilots). Technical officers, engineers and ground crews have the same rank form with the wings of an eagle. The wings of the eagle are on the red stripe in the case of the staff officer, the epaulettes used to be the olive drab or khaki of the Army but with wings.

==== Officers ====
lieutenant pilot	First L. pilot	Captain pilot	Major pilot	L. colonel pilot	Colonel pilot	Brigadier General pilot	Major general pilot	L. general pilot	General pilot

==== Soldiers and Warrant officers ====
Soldiers and warrant officers in Army Aviation Command constitute are the ground crew, responsible for set and preparation of the aircraft on the flight line as well as ground guidance. they are not flying the aircraft, so the epaulette have no eagle's wings. The soldier's uniform does not contain epaulettes.

Soldier	1st Soldier	Sergeant	Corporal	Chief S.

== Equipment ==
=== Helicopters ===
This force reached its peak power at the end of the first Gulf War, when the commanding cadres numbered nearly 900 different helicopters. The armament of the Iraqi army was generally from the eastern bloc. As a result of the policies followed by the Iraqi state, most of the helicopters were Soviet. After 2003 the United States armed the Iraqi army aviation with American and Western helicopters.

In October 2012, it was reported that Iraq had signed a contract with Russia to purchase weapons, including approximately 30 Mil Mi-28 helicopters. The agreement was confirmed on October 9. Part of the deal was later canceled due to the Iraqi parliament's condemnation of the deal on suspicion of corruption, but the Iraqi Defense Minister stated that "the deal will go ahead". The contract was already signed and included the Mil Mi-28NE helicopters, and deliveries began in September 2013. Another 10 aircraft of the same model were delivered in January 2014.

The Army Aviation currently has 218 operational helicopters, including 40 attack helicopters, as follows:

name	image	origin	type	number	notes
Helicopters
Airbus Helicopters H225M Caracal		France	Multi-role	5	14 ordered
Mil Mi-28		Russia	Attack	15	
Bell 206		United States	Train	10	
Bell 407 (IA-407)		United States	Multi-role	24	
Bell 505		United States	Training	15	
Bell OH-58 Kiowa		United States	Training	9	
Airbus Helicopters H135M		France	Light attack	24	
Bell UH-1 Iroquois		United States	Multi purpose	15	
Airbus Helicopters H135		France	Utility	1	
Mil Mi-17		Soviet Union	Multi purpose	45	
T-407	Iraqi Army Aviation Bell 407GX in Al-Kut Airbase	United States	VIP Transport	3	was also used for traning from 2010 to 2012
Bell 407GX		United States	Training And Transport	10	

=== Unmanned Aerial Vehicles (UAVs) ===
name	image	origin	type	number	notes
UAV
CH-5		China	MALE UCAV	Unknown	
CH-4		China	MALE UCAV	1	CH-4B
Bayraktar TB2		Turkey	UCAV		8 on order

Iraq has contracted for 14 CH-4 medium-altitude and long-range (M.A.L.E.) UAV from China, used for reconnaissance and treating targets using precision-guided missiles.

==== Losses of helicopters destroyed during the fight against ISIS ====
Helicopters	origin	downed/ destroyed
Bell 407	United States	1
Mil Mi-17	Soviet Union	1
Mil Mi-28	Russia	1
Mil Mi-35M	Russia	1
Total		4
