= Airbus Helicopters H140 =

Light helicopter manufactured by Airbus

H140

General information
- Type: Medium utility helicopter
- National origin: Multinational
- Manufacturer: Airbus Helicopters

History
- Manufactured: 2024-present
- Introduction date: 2025
- Developed from: Airbus Helicopters H135

The Airbus Helicopters H140 is a light twin-engine utility helicopter developed by Airbus Helicopters. Formally launched at VERTICON in Dallas, Texas on 11 March 2025, it is intended primarily as a medical helicopter. It is planned to enter service in 2028.

== Design and development ==
The Airbus Helicopters H140 was publicly unveiled in March 2025.

The H140 incorporates several design elements from the Airbus Helicopters fleet, including a fenestron tail rotor, a five-blade bearingless main rotor, Helionix avionics with a four-axis autopilot, dual-channel FADEC and a rear clamshell door for patient and cargo loading. A notable addition is a T-tail-shaped tail boom, which Airbus claims provides 80 kg of additional lift in forward flight compared to the H135 and was first used on the Airbus Bluecopter Demonstrator.

The H140 is powered by dual Safran Arrius 2E engines, a variant of those used in the H135, producing a combined output of 1,400 shp—approximately 6% more power than the H135 T3. Airbus has identified helicopter emergency medical services (HEMS) as the primary market for the H140, citing improvements in cabin vibration and noise reduction due to the new rotor system. Additional features include built-in medical lighting in the cabin roof and an increase of approximately 1 cubic meter in cabin space compared to the H135. The tail boom has been raised slightly from the H135 at the rear, providing improved access to the rear doors for patient and cargo loading, as well as increased ground clearance for the fenestron, enhancing operational safety.

== Specifications (H140) ==
Data from

General characteristics

- Crew: 1 pilot
- Capacity: 6 passengers
- Max takeoff weight: 3,175 kg (7,000 lb)
- Powerplant: 2 × Safran Arrius 2E turboshaft engines, 520 kW (700 shp) each
- Main rotor diameter: 10.8 m (35 ft 5 in)
- Main rotor area: 91.6 m^{2} (986 sq ft)

== See also ==
Related lists

- List of rotorcraft
