= Eurocopter EC635 =

Light helicopter

EC635 H135M
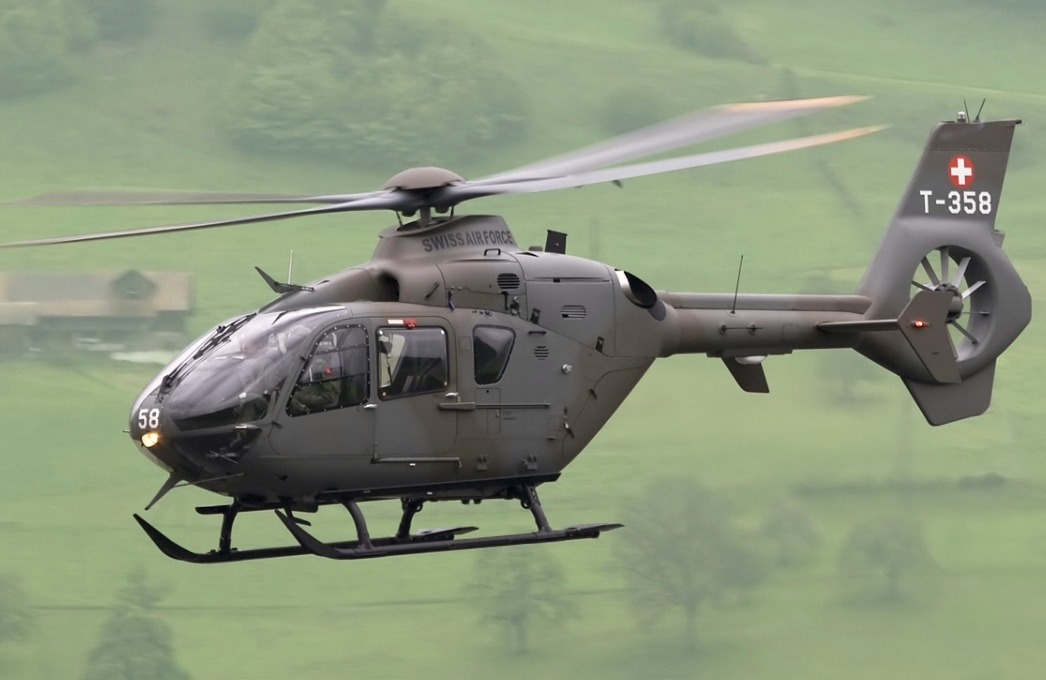
- A EC635 of the Swiss Air Force in flight

General information
- Type: Light utility military helicopter
- National origin: Multinational
- Manufacturer: Eurocopter; Airbus Helicopters
- Status: In Production, Active service
- Primary users: Swiss Air Force; Iraqi Air Force

History
- Manufactured: 1998–present
- Introduction date: May 1998
- Developed from: Eurocopter EC135

The Airbus Helicopters H135M (formerly Eurocopter EC635) is a multi-purpose light helicopter developed by Airbus Helicopters (formerly Eurocopter) as a military version of the Airbus Helicopters H135. It is a twin-engined aircraft and can carry up to 8 people, including the pilot, and a range of military equipment or armaments. The helicopter is marketed for troop transport, medical evacuation, cargo transport, reconnaissance and surveillance and armed combat support missions.

== Development ==
The Eurocopter EC635 was developed to meet a Portuguese Army requirement for a light fire support and medical evacuation helicopter, as part of its programme for the raising of a specialist army aviation unit, the UALE. The EC635 was first revealed at the Aviation Africa exhibition in May 1998, and the Portuguese Ministry of Defence subsequently signed an agreement for nine EC635 T2 helicopters equipped with Turbomeca Arrius 2B2 engines, for €35 million in October 1999. Delivery of the first Portuguese aircraft was expected to begin in 2001; however, continual delays in production led to the Portuguese Ministry of Defence canceling the contract in August 2002, citing Eurocopter's failure to deliver all aircraft between August 2001 and April 2002 as the reason. Eurocopter claimed that disagreements over the integration of weapons systems on the helicopter were the reason for the cancellation.

The Royal Jordanian Air Force agreed to purchase the 9 Portuguese helicopters in October 2002 and the first aircraft was delivered in July 2003. Jordan ordered a further 4 helicopters in January 2006 and deliveries of all machines were completed in 2007.

In April 2006, the Swiss Defence Procurement Agency (Armasuisse) ordered 20 EC635s for the Swiss Air Force, to replace the aging Aérospatiale Alouette III in performing transport and advanced training missions. The first four aircraft were built by Eurocopter, with the remaining 16 being built by RUAG Aerospace in Alpnach, Switzerland, and deliveries were as expected completed between March 2008 and December 2009.

== Design ==
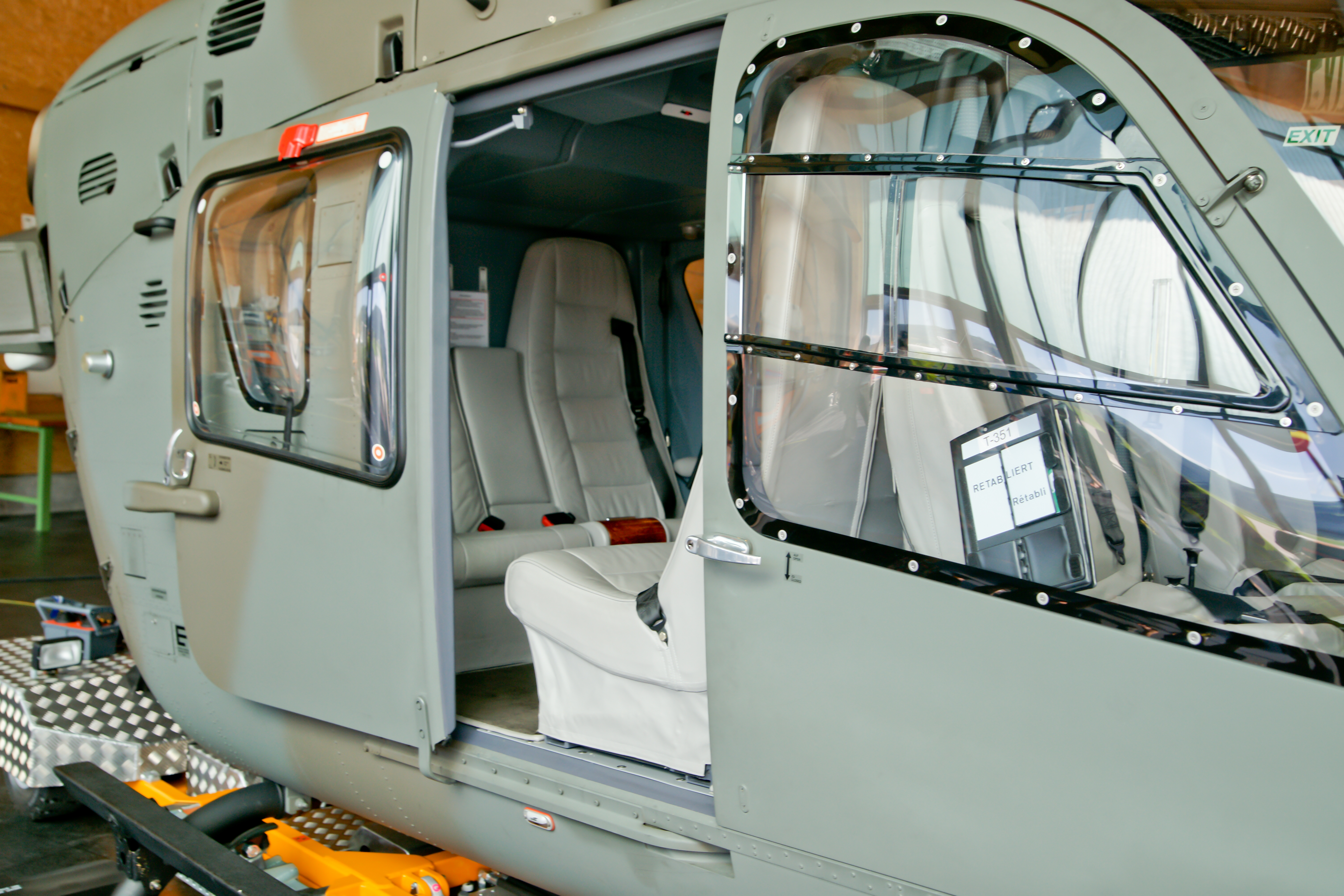
The cabin of the Swiss Air Force EC635P2+ VIP transport version seats four passengers.

The EC635 is based on the Eurocopter EC135, improving upon the design for military operations and making the helicopter capable of carrying weapons systems. The helicopter is fitted with a choice of powerplants, depending on customer requirements, and can be powered by two Pratt & Whitney Canada PW206B2 (EC635 P2+), or two Turbomeca Arrius 2B2 (EC635 T2+). The powerplant is mounted over the baggage compartment and features a Full Authority Digital Engine Control system. The engines power a fibre-reinforced composite Bearingless Main Rotor (BMR) with four blades, and the familiar Fenestron enclosed tail rotor, both of which reduce vibration and noise levels. Vibration levels are further reduced by a built-in Anti Resonance Isolation System (ARIS). The EC635 can be fitted with either a conventional cockpit consisting of a traditional dashboard or a glass cockpit, which utilizes a Thales 'Avionique Nouvelle' suite with MEGHAS Flight Control Display System and active matrix liquid crystal displays.

There are four configurations designed by Eurocopter for the EC635. The Troop Transport version can be fitted with utility seats to carry up to 7 troops with a pilot, or passenger seats to carry up to 6 people and a pilot. The Medical Evacuation version can carry 1 or 2 litters with up to 5 seated medical workers. The Cargo Transport version has 4.9 m^{3} (173.04 ft^{3}) of space for cargo, while the Armed Mission version is equipped with specialist equipment and weapons for combat (such as the 70-mm-rocket launcher FZ233 from Belgian manufacturer Forges de Zeebrugge). The helicopter can also be fitted with a FLIR camera turret, an infra-red capable search light, SAR weather radar and electronic equipment for Observation Missions. Armed EC635s typically feature the Stand Alone Weapon System (SAWS) kit, which comprises a mission and firing control computer onto which various weapon systems and sensors can be integrated; such weapons have included 12.7 mm gun pods, a 20 mm cannon, 70 mm rockets and ZT3 Ingwe anti-tank missiles.

== Operational history ==
In March 2008, the Swiss Air Force received 18 EC635 P2s. The helicopters are to replace their aging fleet of Alouette IIIs in the utility and training role, two of the aircraft are in VIP configuration.

In 2009, Iraq bought 24 EC635 T2+ helicopters. The first two were delivered to Iraq on 8 May 2011. The Iraqi Army has used its EC635s in combat against militants of the Islamic State during the Iraqi Civil War. On 12 December 2014, an Iraqi Army EC635 helicopter was shot down by an insurgent-launched shoulder-fired rocket on the outskirts of the city of Samarra, about 95 kilometers north of Baghdad, killing the two pilots on board. Another EC635 was hit by enemy fire on 22 April 2015 and written off. Both crew members survived. On 13 July of the same year, an EC635 was damaged by shrapnel, either from its own ordnance or due to enemy fire, in the Fallujah area. The helicopter caught fire and crash-landed, but both crew members were unharmed.

== Variants ==
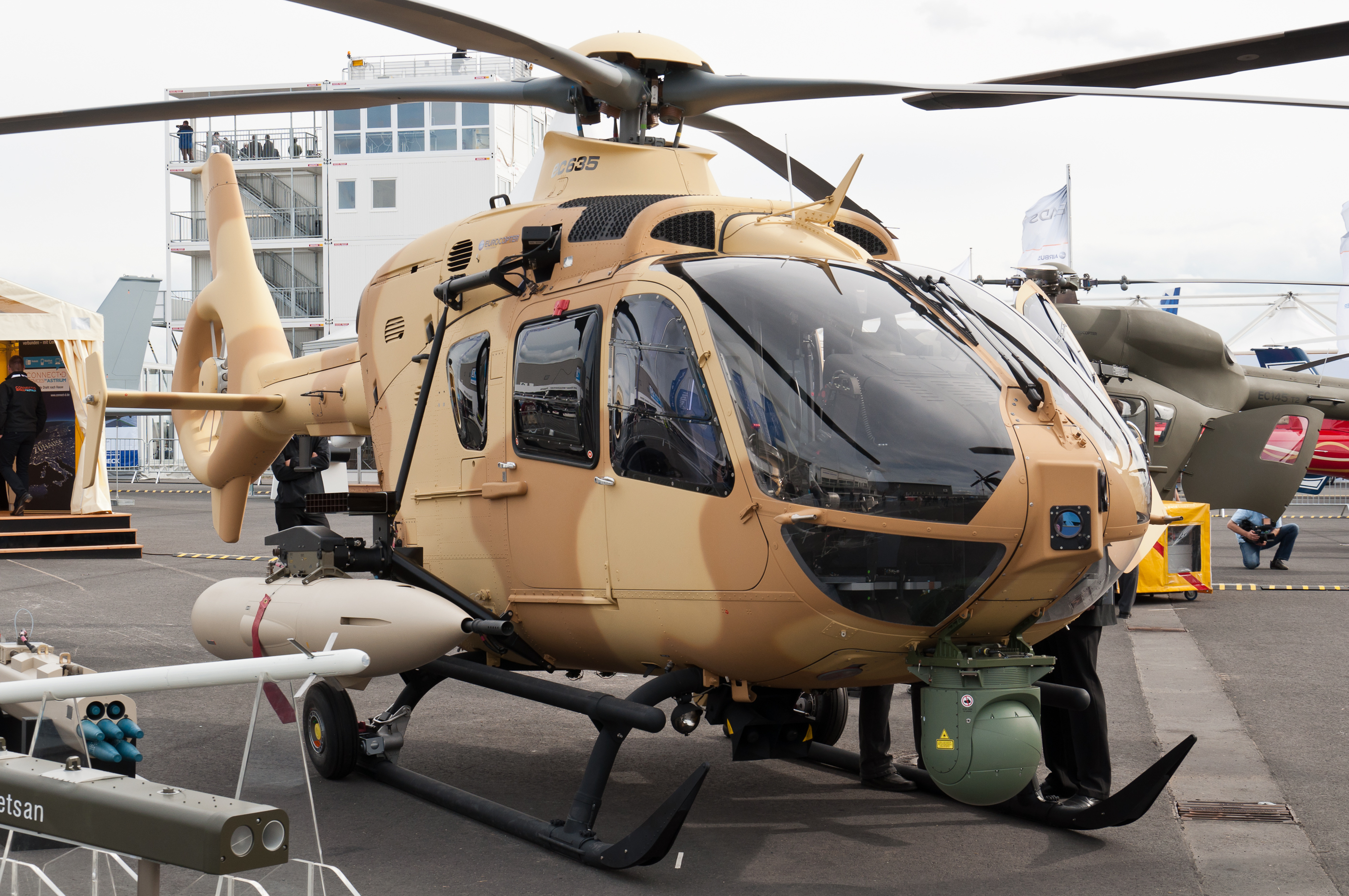
Mock-up of an armed EC635 at ILA 2012

EC635 T1
Certified in 2001, same design as the EC135 T1 with structural reinforcement of cabin structure and powered by two Turbomeca Arrius 2B2 turbine engines.
EC635 P2
Powered by two Pratt & Whitney Canada PW206B2 turbine engines.
EC635 T2
Powered by two Turbomeca Arrius 2B2 turbine engines.
EC635 P2+
Certified in 2006, same design as the EC135 P2+ with structural reinforcement of cabin structure and powered by two PW206B2 turbine engines.
EC635 T2+
Certified in 2006, same design as the EC135 T2+ with structural reinforcement of cabin structure and powered by two Arrius 2B2 turbine engines.

== Operators ==
Iraq

- Iraqi Army Aviation Command - 55th Attack Squadron

Jordan

- Royal Jordanian Air Force

Spain

- Spanish Navy : 10 H135Ms

Switzerland

- Swiss Air Force : 19 EC635 P2+
  - 20 purchased by the air force.
  - 1 of the 20 lost in November 2024.

UK

- Army Air Corps : 5 H135M ordered, Project Matcha, Gazelle replacement. Mothballed upon delivery Leased to Australian Army.

== Specifications (EC635 P2) ==

Data from Eurocopter EC635 fas.org

General characteristics

- Crew: 1 pilot
- Capacity: up to 8 troops or 1,443 kg (3,181 lb) payload
- Length: 10.21 m (33 ft 6 in)
- Height: 3.62 m (11 ft 11 in)
- Empty weight: 1,467 kg (3,234 lb)
- Max takeoff weight: 2,900 kg (6,393 lb)
- Powerplant: 2 × Pratt & Whitney Canada PW206B2 turboshaft engines, 609 kW (817 hp) each
- Main rotor diameter: 10.2 m (33 ft 6 in)
- Main rotor area: 81.7 m^{2} (879 sq ft)

Performance

- Maximum speed: 259 km/h (161 mph, 140 kn)
- Cruise speed: 254 km/h (158 mph, 137 kn)
- Never exceed speed: 278 km/h (173 mph, 150 kn)
- Range: 650 km (400 mi, 350 nmi)
- Service ceiling: 6,095 m (19,997 ft)
- Rate of climb: 10.9 m/s (2,150 ft/min)

== See also ==
Related development

- MBB Bo 105
- Eurocopter EC135

Aircraft of comparable role, configuration, and era

- AgustaWestland AW109
- Bell 427
- Bell 429 GlobalRanger
- MD Helicopters MD Explorer

Related lists

- List of rotorcraft
