= Turbomeca Arrius =

Type of turboshaft engine for helicopters

Arrius
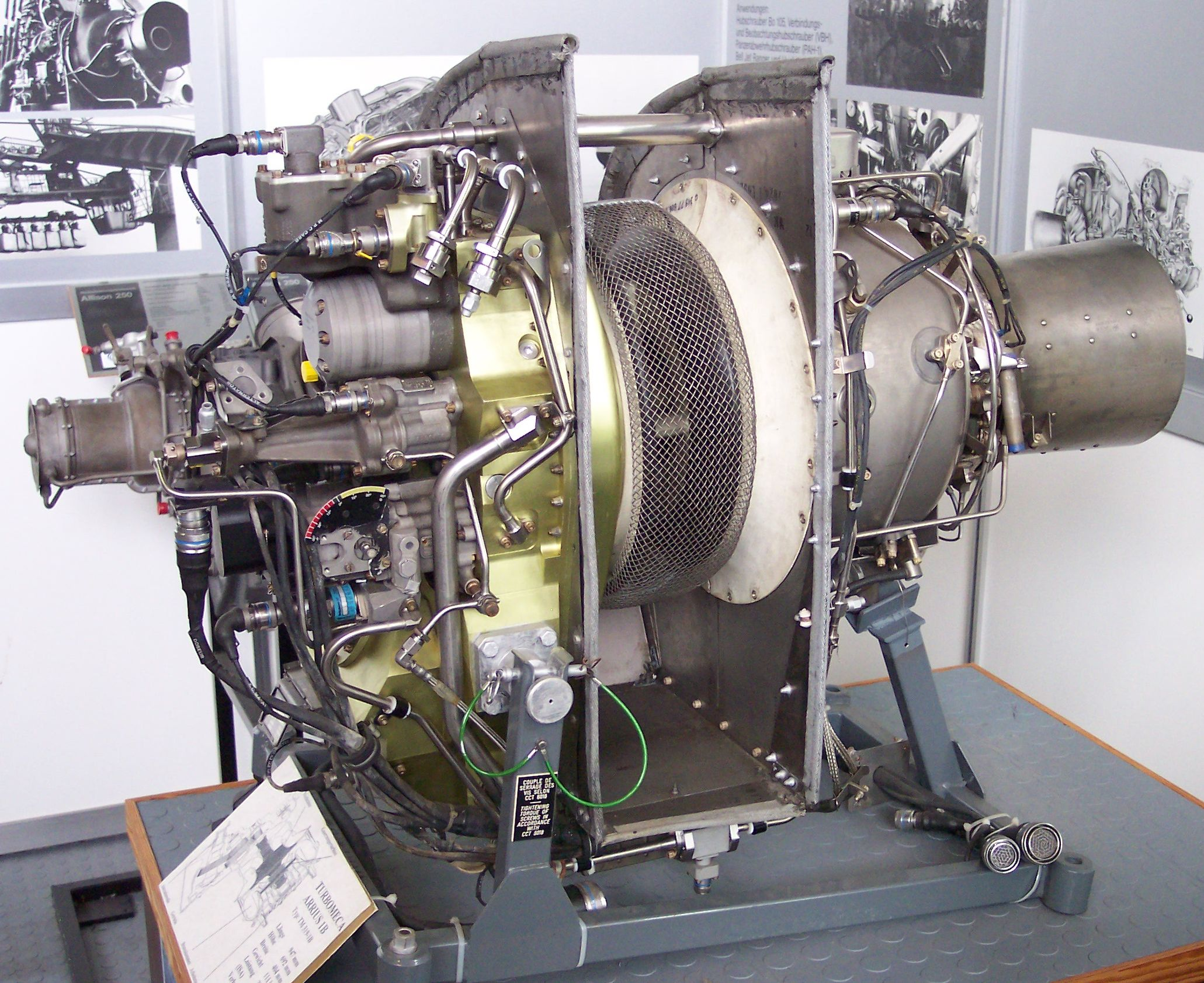
- Turbomeca Arrius 1B
- Type: Turboshaft
- National origin: France
- Manufacturer: Safran Helicopter Engines
- First run: 1981
- Major applications: Eurocopter EC120 Colibri; Eurocopter EC135; Kamov Ka-226
- Number built: 2800

The Turbomeca Arrius is one of a family of turboshaft engines for helicopter use, first produced in 1981. As of 2012, some 2,700 units had been sold. Power ranges between 357 kW (479 shp) and 530 kW (710 shp) for different versions. Following Turbomeca tradition, the Arrius was named after a Pyrenean peak (pic d'Arrius), located in the Ossau Valley near Pau.

== Variants ==
Arrius 1A
Arrius 1A1
Arrius 1M
Arrius 2B1
Arrius 2B1A
Arrius 2B2
Arrius 2E
Arrius 2F
Arrius 2K1
Arrius 2K2
Arrius 2G1
Arrius 2R

== Applications ==
=== Turboshafts ===
- Agusta A109 Power (2 x Arrius 2K1)
- Airbus Helicopters H140 (2 x Arrius 2E)
- Bell 505 Jet Ranger X (1 x Arrius 2R)
- Eurocopter AS355 N Ecureuil 2 (2 x Arrius 1A)
- Eurocopter AS355 NP Ecureuil 2 (2 x Arrius 1A1)
- Eurocopter AS555 Fennec (2 x Arrius 1M)
- Eurocopter EC135 T1 (2 x Arrius 2B1/2B1A)
- Eurocopter EC135 T2 (2 x Arrius 2B2)
- Eurocopter EC635 T1 (2 x Arrius 2B1/2B1A)
- Eurocopter EC635 T2 (2 x Arrius 2B2)
- Eurocopter EC120B Colibri (1 x Arrius 2F)
- Kamov Ka-226T (2 x Arrius 2G1)

== Specifications (Arrius 1A) ==
Data from FAA Type Certificate Data Sheet.

==== General characteristics ====
- Type: Twin-spool free-turbine turboshaft
- Length: 63 in (1601 mm)
- Diameter: 17.2 in (436 mm)
- Dry weight: 223.3 lb (101.3 kg)

==== Components ====
- Compressor: Single stage centrifugal
- Combustors: Annular reverse flow combustion chamber
- Turbine: Single stage power turbine, single stage gas generator turbine

==== Performance ====
- Maximum power output: 520 shp (390 kW)
- Turbine inlet temperature: 870 °C

== See also ==
Related lists

- List of aircraft engines
