= Ascent Flight Training =

Flight training company

- Type: Public limited company
- Industry: Aerospace and Defence
- Founded: 2008; 18 years ago
- Headquarters: Bristol, United Kingdom
- Area served: Ministry of Defence
- Key people: Chloe Barker (MD)
- Revenue: £17.449 million (2019)
- Total assets: £54.503 million (2019)
- Number of employees: 420 (2026)
- Website: ascentflighttraining.com

Ascent Flight Training is a flight training company set up as a venture between Lockheed Martin and Babcock International to deliver flying training to pilots and aircrew from the three services of the UK Armed Forces as part of a Private Finance Initiative (PFI).

== UK Military Flying Training System (UKMFTS) ==
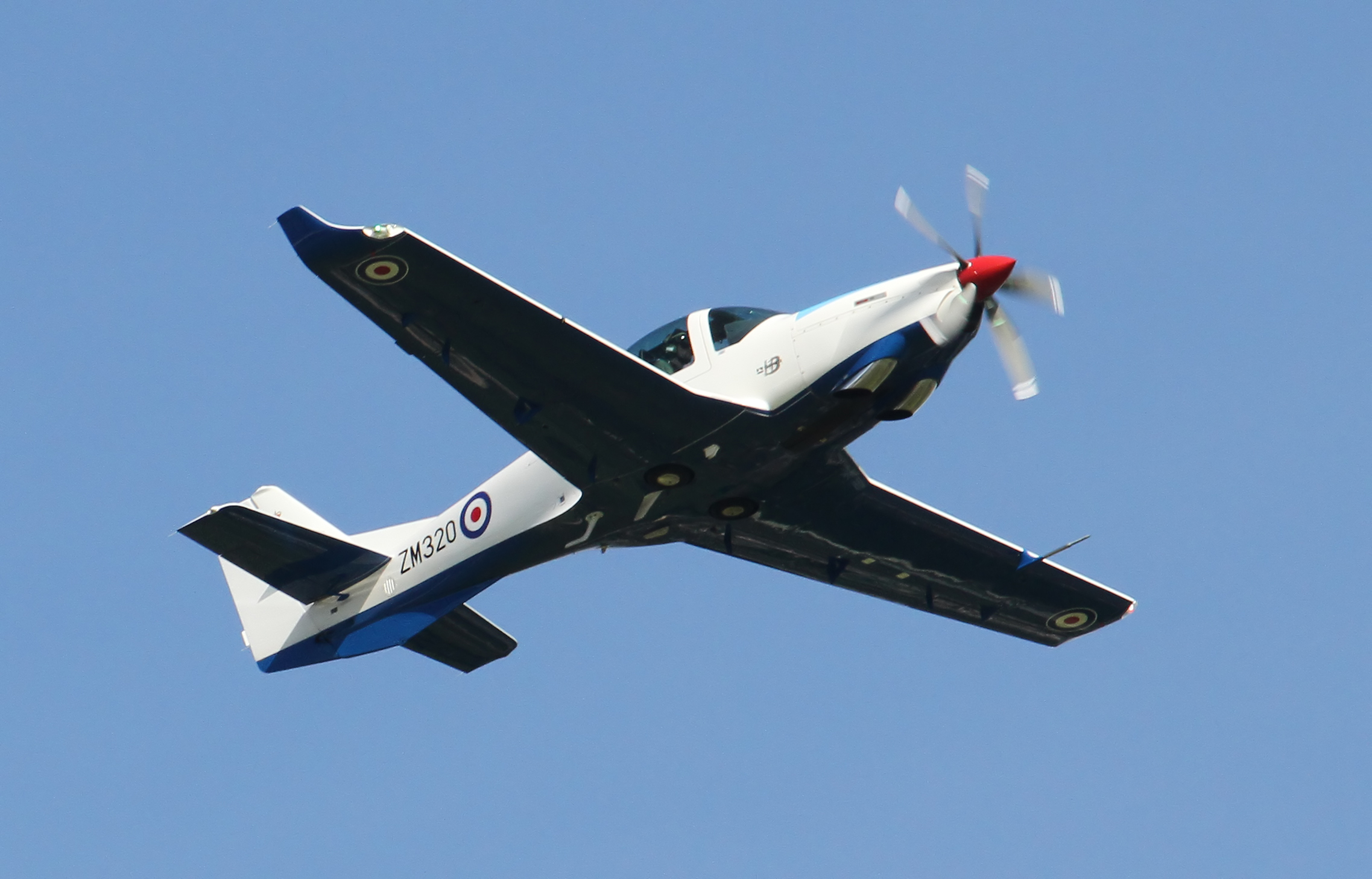
A Grob Prefect T1 aircraft used by Ascent to deliver training

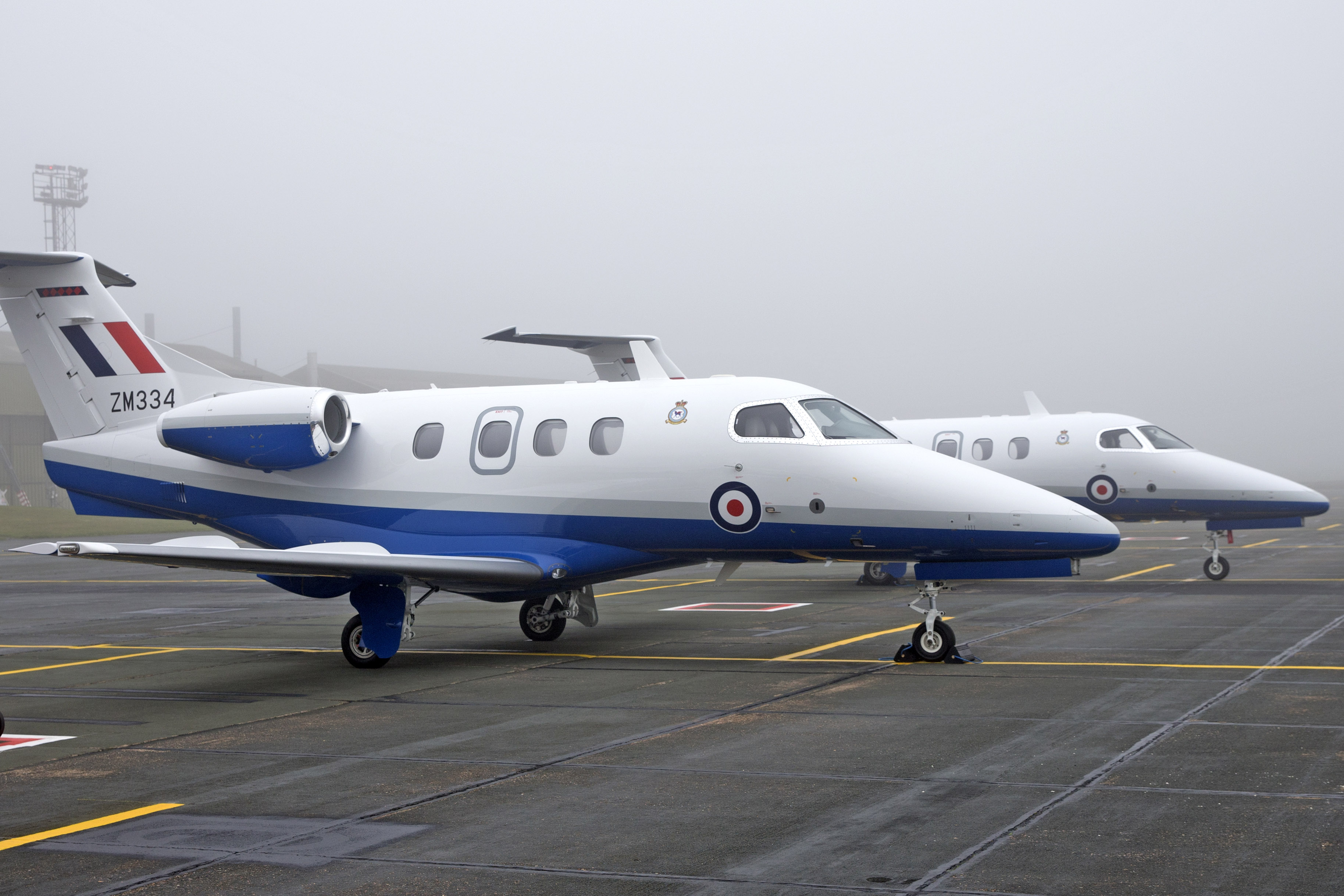
An Embraer Phenom 100, operated by No. 45 Squadron used to deliver Multi-engine training

Ascent was chosen to deliver the £3.2 billion UKMFTS contract over 25 years, training military aircrew from the Army Air Corps, Fleet Air Arm and Royal Air Force up to their respective Operational Conversion Units.

Ascent is responsible for delivering:

- Fixed wing training at RAF Cranwell and RAF Valley
- Rotary training at RAF Shawbury and RAF Valley.

== See also ==
- UK Military Flying Training System
