= Emergency medical services in the Netherlands =

Emergency medical services in the Netherlands is a system of pre hospital care provided by the government in partnership with private companies.

== Organization ==
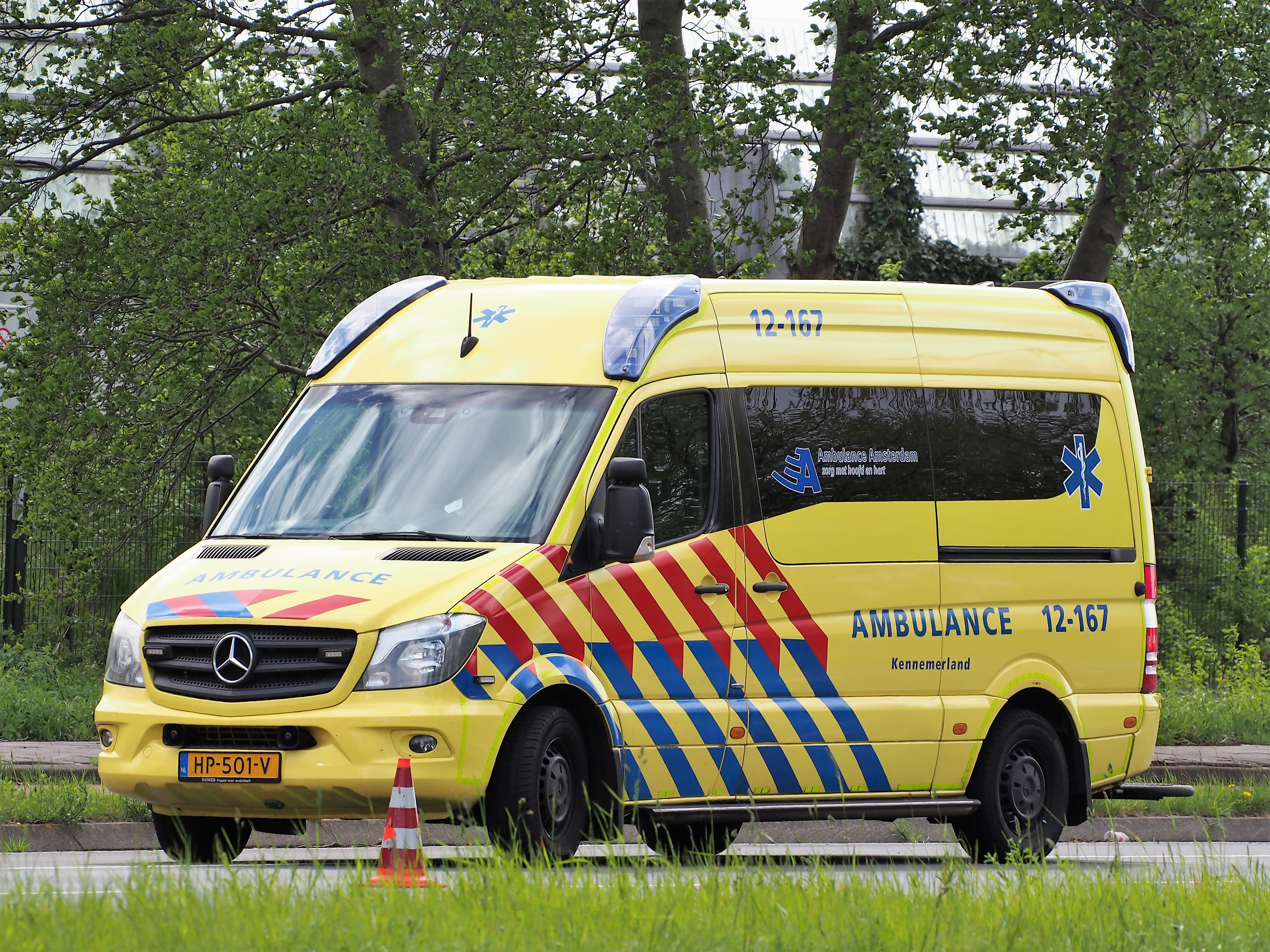
One of the currently used types of ambulance vehicles

=== Land Ambulance ===
Emergency medical service in the Netherlands is provided by a number of private carriers, operating under contract to the Dutch government. The system consists of a number of private ambulance companies, each with its own designated service area within one of fifteen service delivery regions, and with standards of operation that are provided by the government contract. All contracts stipulate that the contractor is required to meet all standards published for vehicles, equipment, training, and performance by the Dutch Ambulance Institute. All contracts for EMS in the Netherlands are sent to tender every four years, with the contract being awarded to the most successful applicants. Netherlands law forbids EMS systems to earn any profit; any surplus revenue is required to be directed to additional improvements to the system, including training, equipment, and vehicles. The Dutch system is a rare exception to the rule in Europe, in that it operates on a variation of the Anglo-American model of EMS care, and not on the Franco-German model, followed by the majority of European countries.

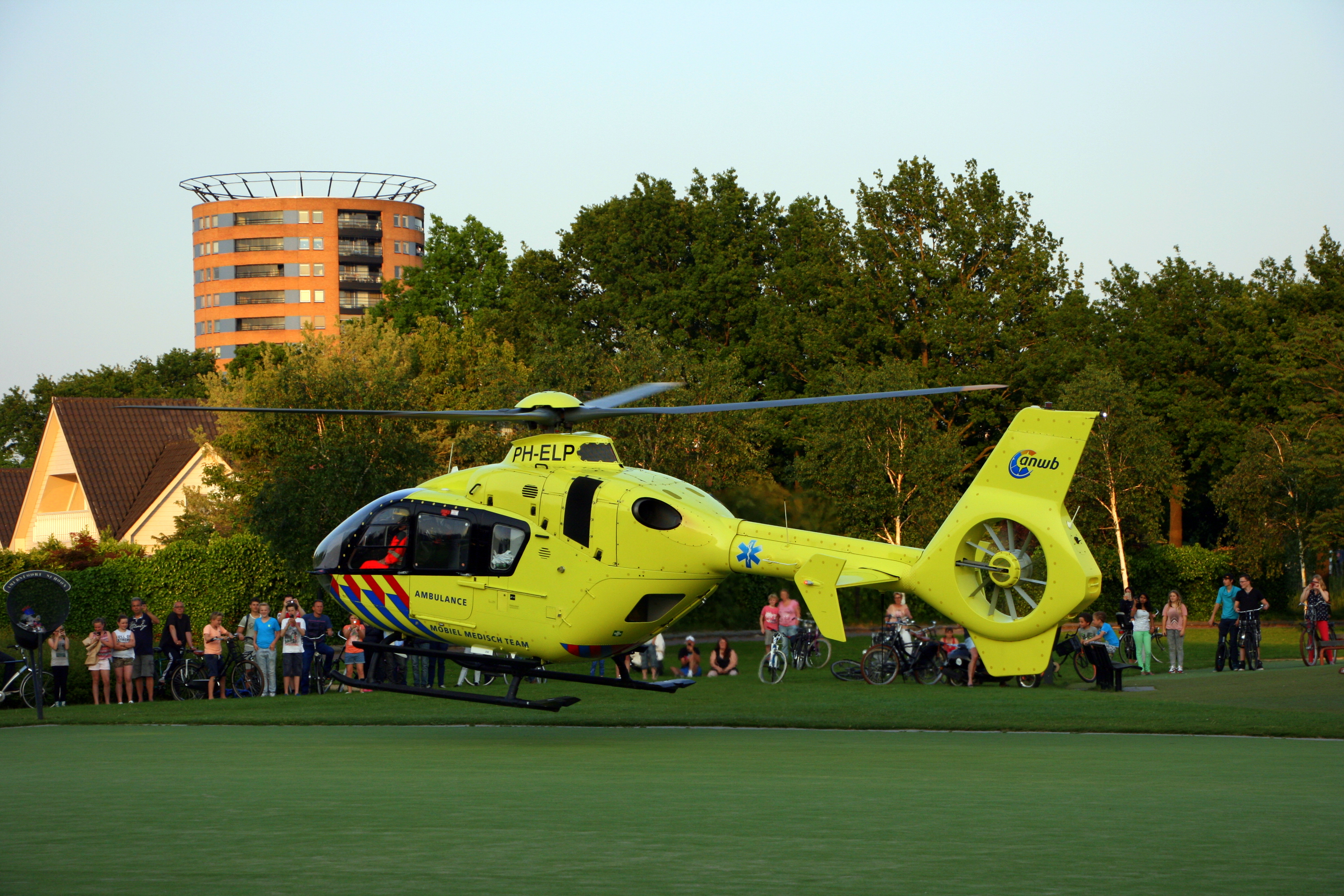
Air ambulance in Amersfoort

=== Air Ambulance ===
The government of the Netherlands contracts for air ambulance service, which is provided by four helicopters, all of which are in service around the clock. These helicopters are strategically located around the country to minimize response times. Air units may perform high-acuity inter-facility transfers, or may also respond to the location where an emergency is occurring, to assist with immediate care or facilitate rapid transport of high-acuity victims. All air ambulance helicopters are staffed by both nurse and physicians. The primary role of the helicopters is the rapid delivery of the Mobile Medical Team, and transport of the patient by aircraft, while possible, is not the preferred outcome. In some cases, particularly for response to offshore emergencies, the civilian air ambulance system is supplemented by the three helicopters of the Search and Rescue service of the Netherlands Coastguard; using assets provided by the Royal Netherlands Navy and Royal Netherlands Air and Space Force. All of these helicopters are transport-capable. Some areas of the Netherlands also receive emergency air ambulance service from helicopters or vehicles based in Belgium and Germany, since these locations are beyond the normal flight range of the Dutch-owned aircraft.

== Standards ==
Star of Life, depicted on every Dutch medical vehicle

=== Training ===
Since 1992, Dutch law has mandated at least one nurse on every ambulance in the country, at all times. The nurses employed on ambulances have all completed the full training required for a registered nurse in the Netherlands, and have then completed additional training and certification in anesthesia, intensive care, cardiac care, or emergency room, to apply for an additional year of training to qualify as a Registered Ambulance Nurse. All "paramedics" in the Netherlands are nurses. The term ‘paramedic’ is not used in the Dutch system. As a result of this measure, all Dutch ambulances and rapid response vehicles are capable of providing Advanced Life Support (ALS) without online medical control. The exceptional level of training permits what is, for the most part, independent practice, conducted according to a set of National Emergency Care Protocols, issued by the Dutch Ambulance Institute, and reviewed and revised every four years. Medical oversight for protocol compliance is conducted by each service's Medical Manager, who is a licensed physician. On those occasions when the patient's condition actually exceeds the paramedic protocols, the paramedic has the option of either calling their own Medical Manager for additional instructions, or requesting the response of a mobile medical team.

=== Staffing ===
All ambulances are staffed by a crew of two. These include one nurse, with the training and skill set described above, and one dedicated driver. The medical training of the driver is minimal, and that individual is minimal permitted to participate in patient care with assisting the nurse. Mobile medical teams (MMT) are generally staffed by a surgeon or anesthesiologist with additional training to function in the prehospital environment and additional nurses. MMT aircraft are designed for team delivery, not medical transport. Transport is usually accomplished by means of the ambulance that originated the call, with the team on board. In case of weather that restricts flight operations, each MMT is also equipped with a special van for land response.

=== Vehicles ===
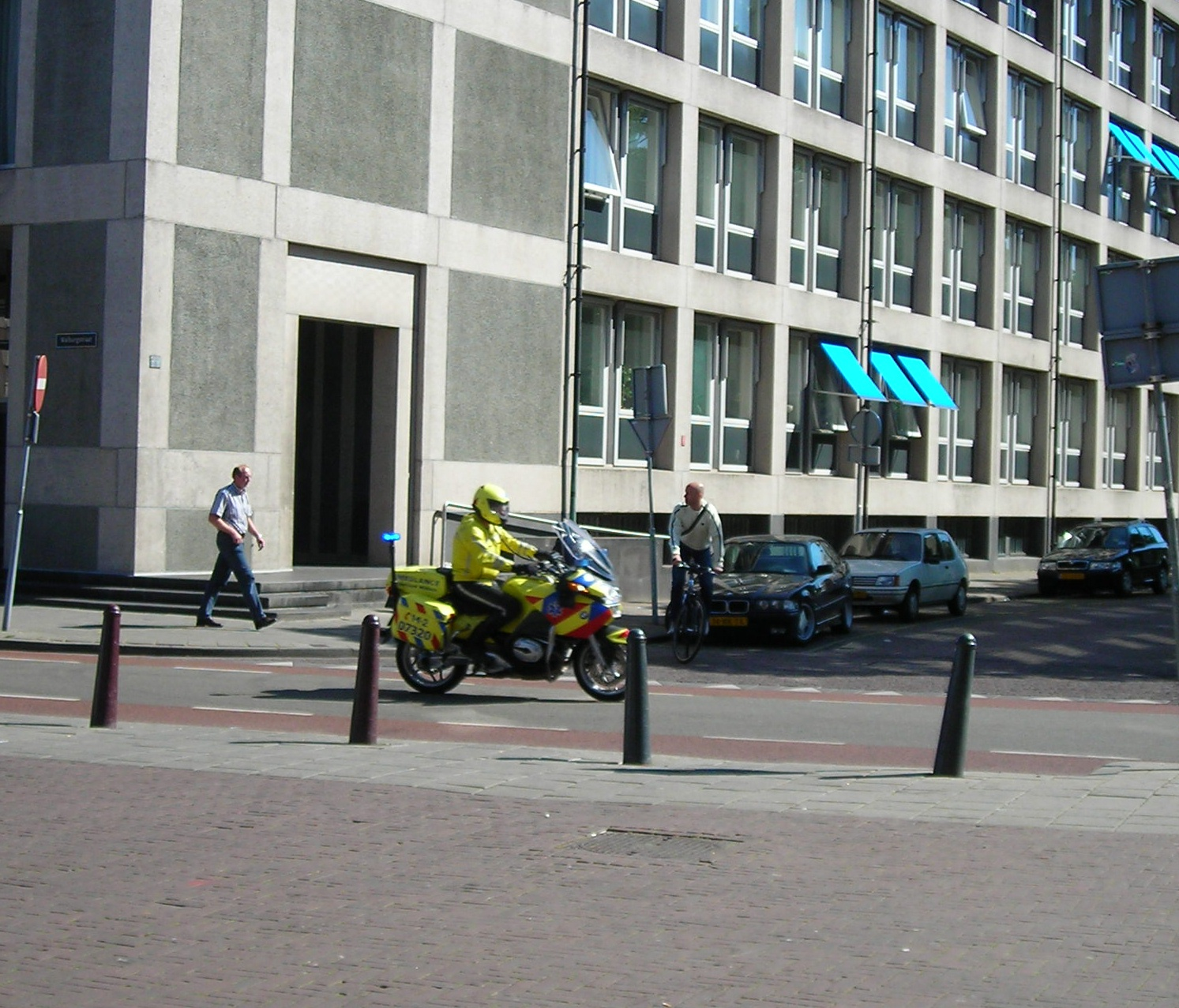
Dutch Paramedic Motorcycle

The Netherlands government mandates that all ambulances must meet the standards outlined by the Netherlands Ambulance Institute, in addition to the European standard CEN 1789, as published by the European Committee for Standards. These standards are applied to the types of vehicles and the types of medical equipment required. However, the Dutch system does not comply with all of the elements of the visual identity program beyond the basic colors of vehicles and warning systems, and has no plans to comply with the marking schemes standards. In addition to conventional ambulances, in some areas, particularly those subject to urban traffic congestion, some Dutch paramedics also use ALS equipped motorcycles as Rapid Response Vehicles.

=== Dispatch ===
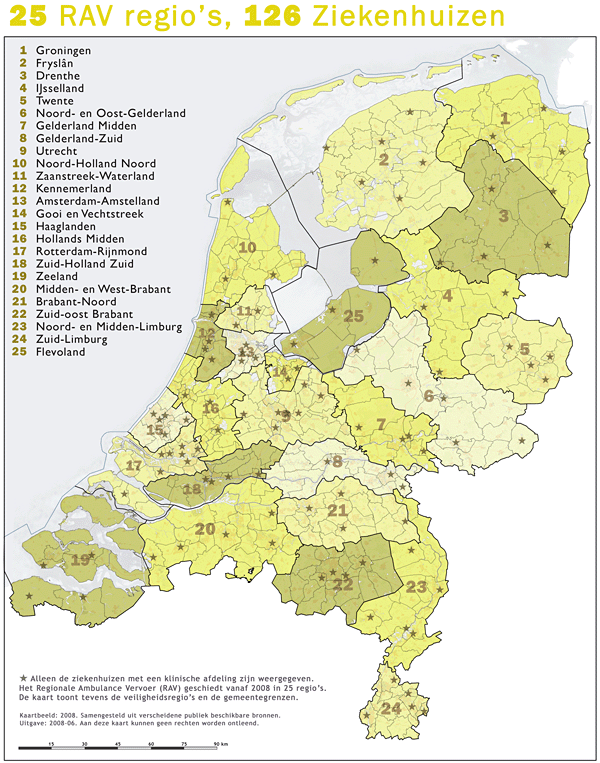
Dutch EMS Dispatch Regions

All 25 EMS regions in the Netherlands are self-dispatching. Some regions have more than one centre, but all are interconnected. The technologies involved in the dispatch of EMS resources are generally equivalent to the American and British standards. All EMS dispatch centers participate in the national emergency number scheme. The emergency telephone number for ambulances in the Netherlands is 112. All EMS calls in the Netherlands are nurse-triaged. Triage is conducted using national evidence-based triage protocols and guidelines developed by the Dutch Ambulance Institute. Most dispatch centers use computer-based decision-support systems. As a result of this approximately 30 percent of all requests for service are dealt with by some other means of service at the scene, and in approximately 40 percent of cases, the call is triaged with a result that an ambulance response is avoided entirely.

=== Response time ===
Dutch law provides support for all standards published by the Netherlands Ambulance Institute, which currently mandates that an ambulance must be in place on the scene of any emergency in the country within 15 minutes. That standard is currently being met approximately 95 percent of the time.

== See also ==
- Healthcare in the Netherlands
- Emergency medical services
- Emergency nursing
- International Red Cross and Red Crescent Movement
