= AgustaWestland AW109S Grand =

Italian multi-purpose helicopter

AW109S Grand
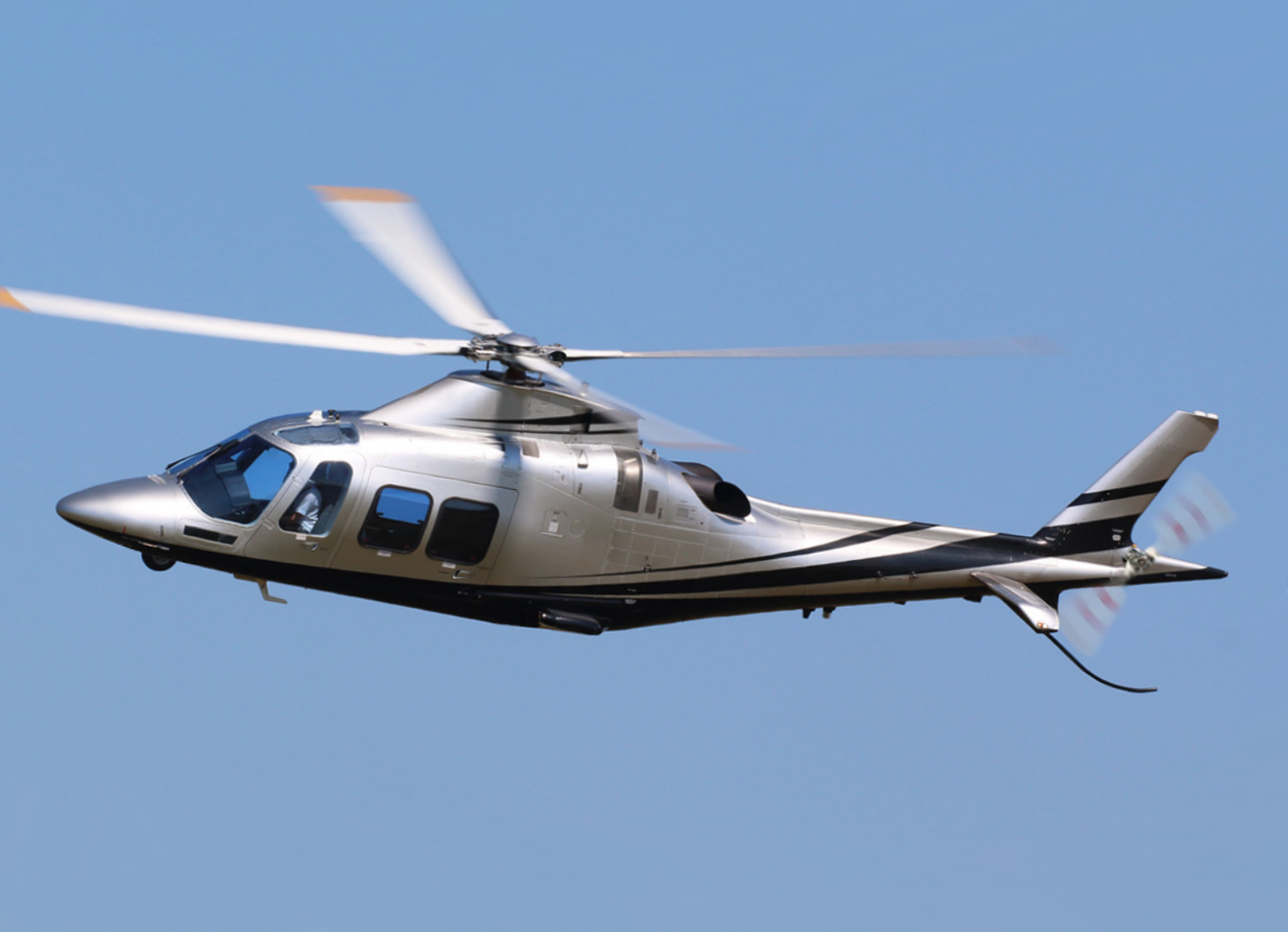
- AW109 Grand in flight

General information
- Type: SAR/utility helicopter
- Manufacturer: Agusta; AgustaWestland
- Status: Active service/In production

History
- Manufactured: 2002–present
- Introduction date: 2005
- Developed from: Agusta A109E Power

The AgustaWestland AW109S Grand is a lightweight, twin-engine, eight-seat multi-purpose helicopter built by the Italian manufacturer AgustaWestland. This rotorcraft has been developed from AgustaWestland AW109 by lengthening the cabin and main rotor blades with different tip design. The Agusta Grand is fitted with two Pratt & Whitney Canada PW207C engines whereas its predecessor AW109E has two Pratt & Whitney Canada PW206C engines. It originally entered service in 2005 and has since been used in various roles, including light transport, medevac, search-and-rescue, and military roles.

== Variants ==
A109S Grand
Marketed as the AW109 Grand, has a lengthened cabin-upgraded civilian version with two Pratt & Whitney Canada PW207C engines and lengthened main rotor blades with different tip design from the previous AW109E version.
AW109SP GrandNew
Single pilot IFR, TAWS and EVS, with new avionics and front section of the fuselage made from carbon fiber to reduce weight.
AW109SP "Da Vinci"
Customised version of the AW109SP for REGA (Swiss Air Rescue), with fixed landing gear.
AW109 Trekker
AW109S Grand airframe with fixed landing skids, equipped with a Genesys Aerosystems glass cockpit.

== Specifications (A109S Grand with PW207) ==
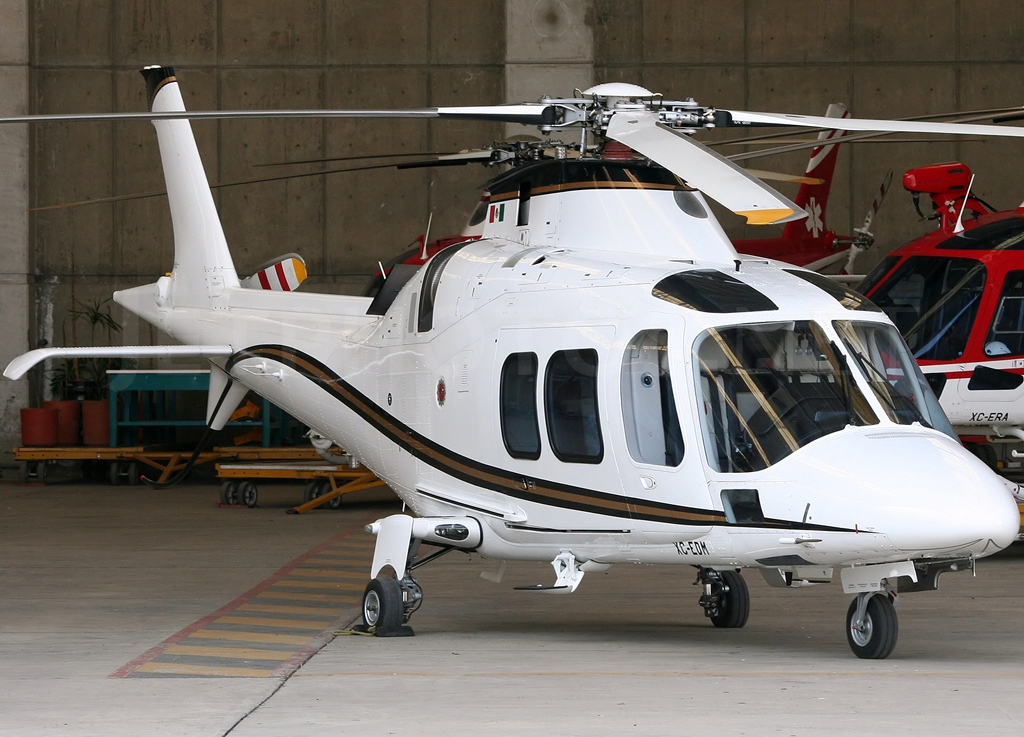
Agusta A109S Grand in Mexico

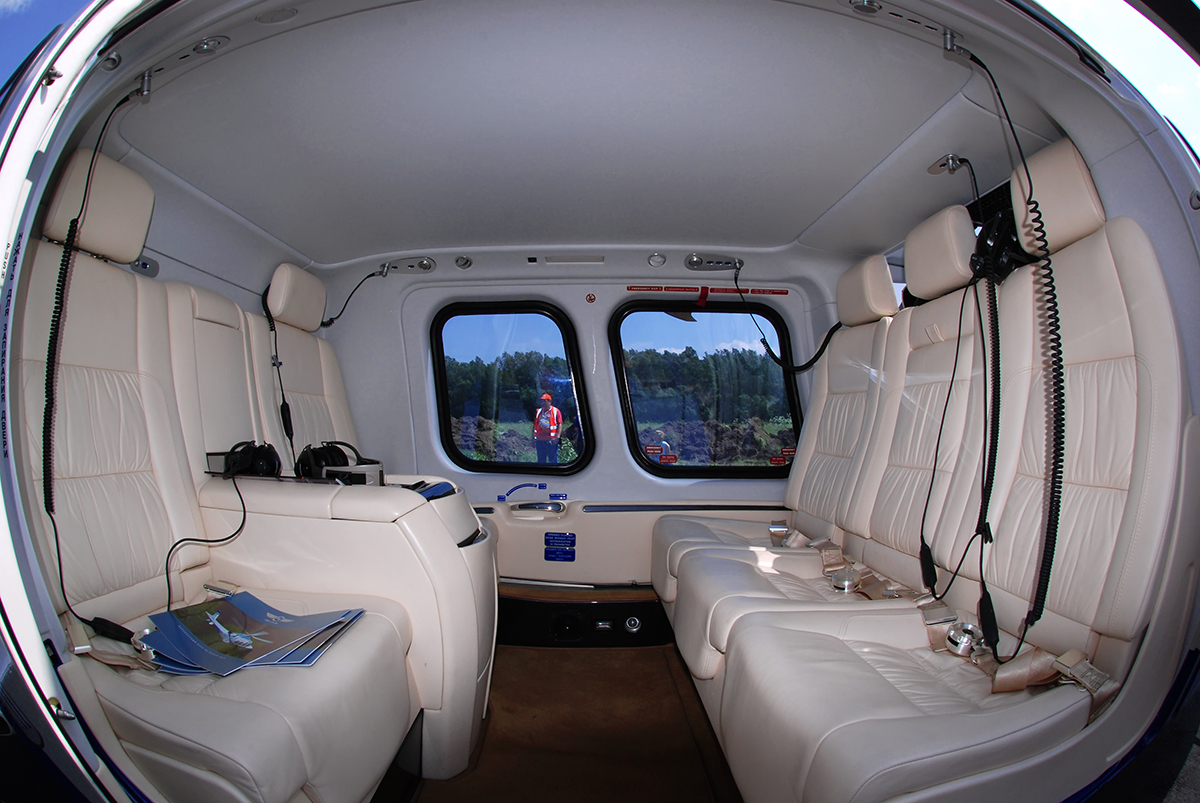
Agusta 109S Grand VVIP interiors with cabinet

Data from

General characteristics

- Crew: 1 or 2
- Capacity: 6 or 7 passengers
- Length: 12.96 m (42 ft 6 in) fuselage
- Height: 3.4 m (11 ft 2 in)
- Max takeoff weight: 3,175 kg (7,000 lb) internal MTOW
- Powerplant: 2 × Pratt & Whitney Canada PW207C Turboshaft engine, 548 kW (735 hp) each
- Main rotor diameter: 10.83 m (35 ft 6 in)

Performance

- Maximum speed: 311 km/h (193 mph, 168 kn)
- Cruise speed: 289 km/h (180 mph, 156 kn)
- Never exceed speed: 311 km/h (193 mph, 168 kn)
- Ferry range: 859 km (534 mi, 464 nmi)
- Service ceiling: 4,900 m (16,200 ft)
- Rate of climb: 9.3 m/s (1,830 ft/min)

== See also ==
Aircraft of comparable role, configuration, and era

- Bell 429 GlobalRanger
- Eurocopter EC135
- Eurocopter EC145
- MD 902
