= Rega (air rescue) =

Swiss air rescue service

Swiss Air-Rescue
IATA	ICAO	Call sign
-	SAZ	SWISS AMBULANCE
- Founded: 1952
- Fleet size: 21
- Headquarters: Zürich, Switzerland
- Website: www.rega.ch

Swiss Air-Rescue (German: Schweizerische Rettungsflugwacht, French: Garde aérienne suisse de sauvetage, Italian: Guardia aerea svizzera di soccorso, Rega) is a private, non-profit air rescue service that provides emergency medical assistance in Switzerland and Liechtenstein. Rega was founded on 27 April 1952 by Rudolf Bucher, who believed that the Swiss rescue service needed a specialized air branch. Rega mainly assists in mountain rescues, but also operates in other terrains when necessary, especially in life-threatening emergencies. Rega also provides a repatriation and medical advice service for members who experience a medical emergency while abroad and local treatment is not available.

Rega also aids alpine farmers during the summer months in rescuing livestock and retrieving dead animals.

As a non-profit foundation, Rega does not receive financial assistance from any government. They are quite unusual within Europe, with the majority of their costs paid through the annual fees of private contributors (As of 2016: 3.2 million patrons, 38% of the population). In exchange, Rega does not charge its contributors for its search, rescue and repatriation costs. One other rare aspect of Rega is that people in distress can call for a helicopter rescue directly (phone number 1414). In case of insufficient mobile phone coverage, alpinists can also use emergency radio telephone (161.3 MHz).

The head office, the Rega Centre, (home to the Rega operations center where all missions are coordinated) is a hangar located at the northeast section of Zurich Airport within the municipality of Kloten; the hangar has direct access to the runways of the airport. All Rega helicopters carry a crew of three: a pilot, an emergency physician, and a paramedic who is also trained to assist the pilot for radio communication, navigation, terrain/object avoidance, and winch operations. In some situations, such as evacuating cable cars or retrieving injured climbers from a rock face, the crew also consists of a specialist trained by the Swiss Alpine Club.

In the Canton of Valais, helicopter search and rescue is carried out by Air Glaciers and Air Zermatt.

== Name ==
Composite photo of mountain take-off by Agusta A109 SP helicopter from Rega air rescue service

The name Rega was created by combining letters from the name "Swiss Air Rescue Guard" as it was written in German (Schweizerische Rettungsflugwacht), French (Garde Aérienne Suisse de Sauvetage), and Italian (Guardia Aerea Svizzera di Soccorso). The decision to change the name was made in 1979, to create a uniform and more concise name for speakers of the three languages.

== Bases and their locations ==
- Rega Center (operations headquarters) at Zurich Airport LSZH
- Dübendorf LSMD AFB (Rega 1), Dübendorf Air Base
- Basel LFSB (Rega 2), EuroAirport Basel Mulhouse Freiburg, France
- Bern LSZB (Rega 3), Bern-Belp Airport
- Lausanne LSGL (Rega 4)
- Untervaz LSXU (Rega 5)
- Locarno LSMO AFB (Rega 6) at Locarno Airport LSZL
- St. Gallen (Rega 7)
- Erstfeld LSXE (Rega 8)
- Samedan LSZS (Rega 9)
- Wilderswil/Interlaken LSXI (Rega 10)
- Mollis LSMF (Rega 12)
- Zweisimmen (Rega 14)
- Geneva LSGG (Rega 15), Geneva Airport. This base uses an EC-135 belonging to the University Hospital of Geneva, but is operated on
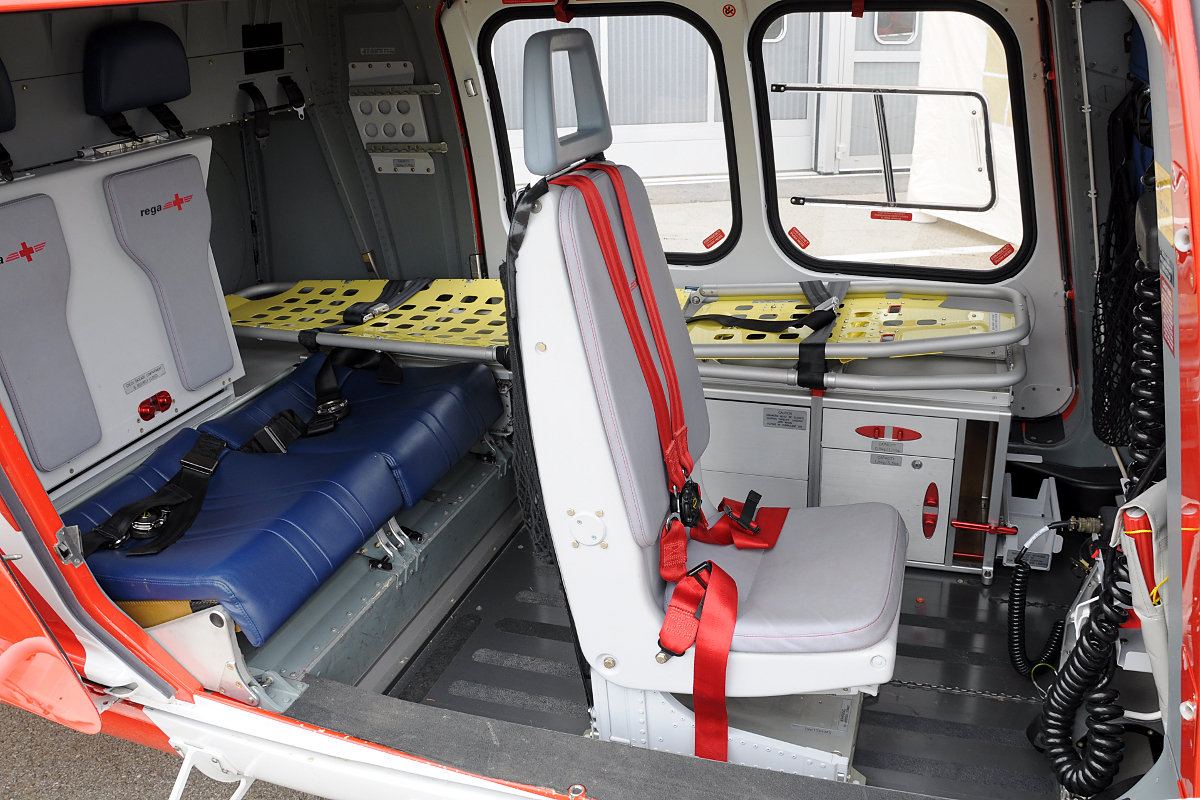
  Rega Agusta A109SP Cabin.
  behalf of Rega.
- Sion LSGS (Rega 18), Sion Airport

== Pilots ==
Ursula Bühler Hedinger, first woman from Switzerland to hold a license to fly a jet and the first Swiss female flight instructor flew for REGA for over 25 years.

== Helicopter fleet ==
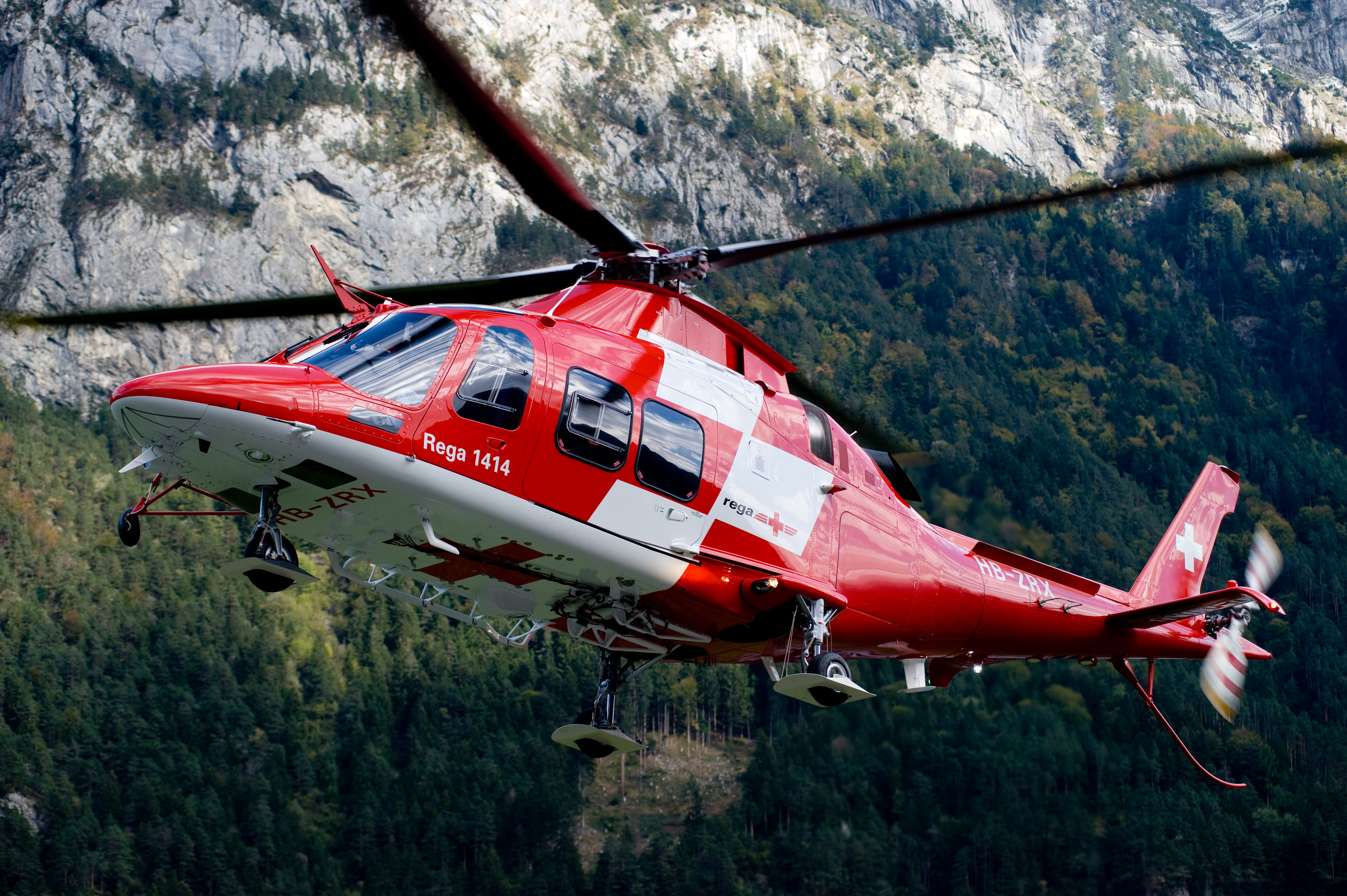
AW109SP Da Vinci

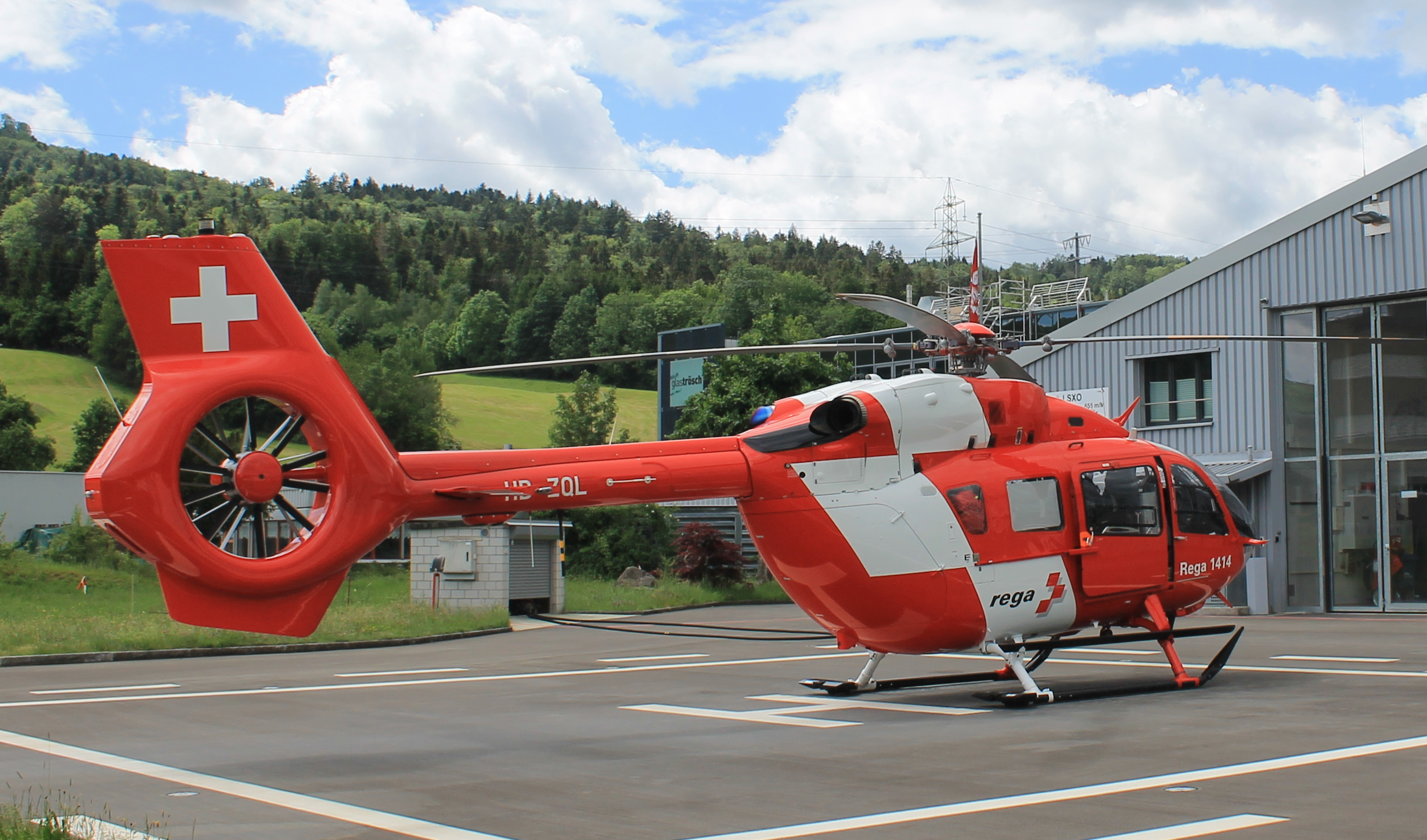
Airbus H145 D2

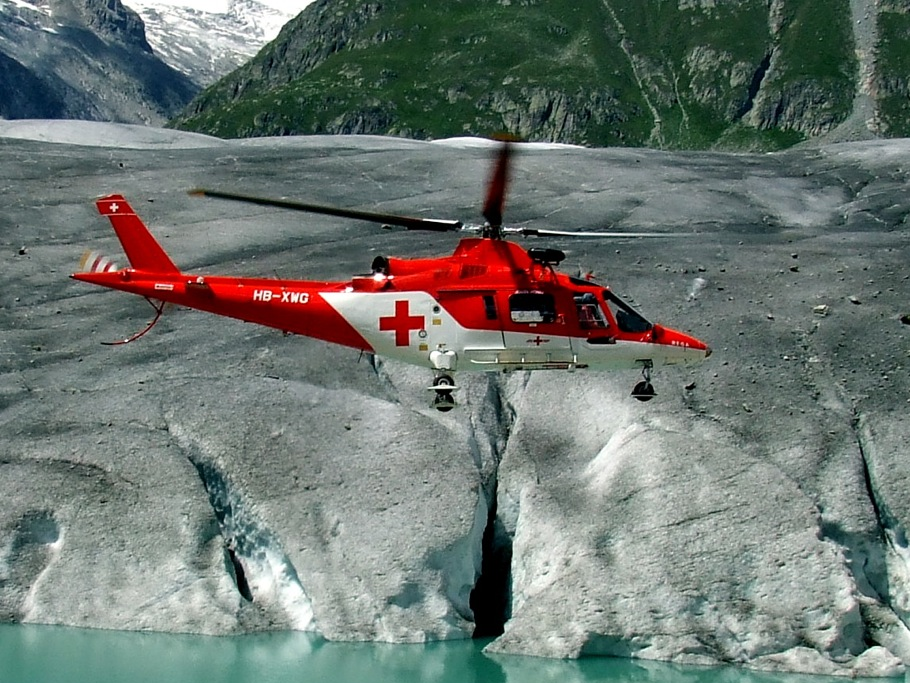
Agusta A.109 K2

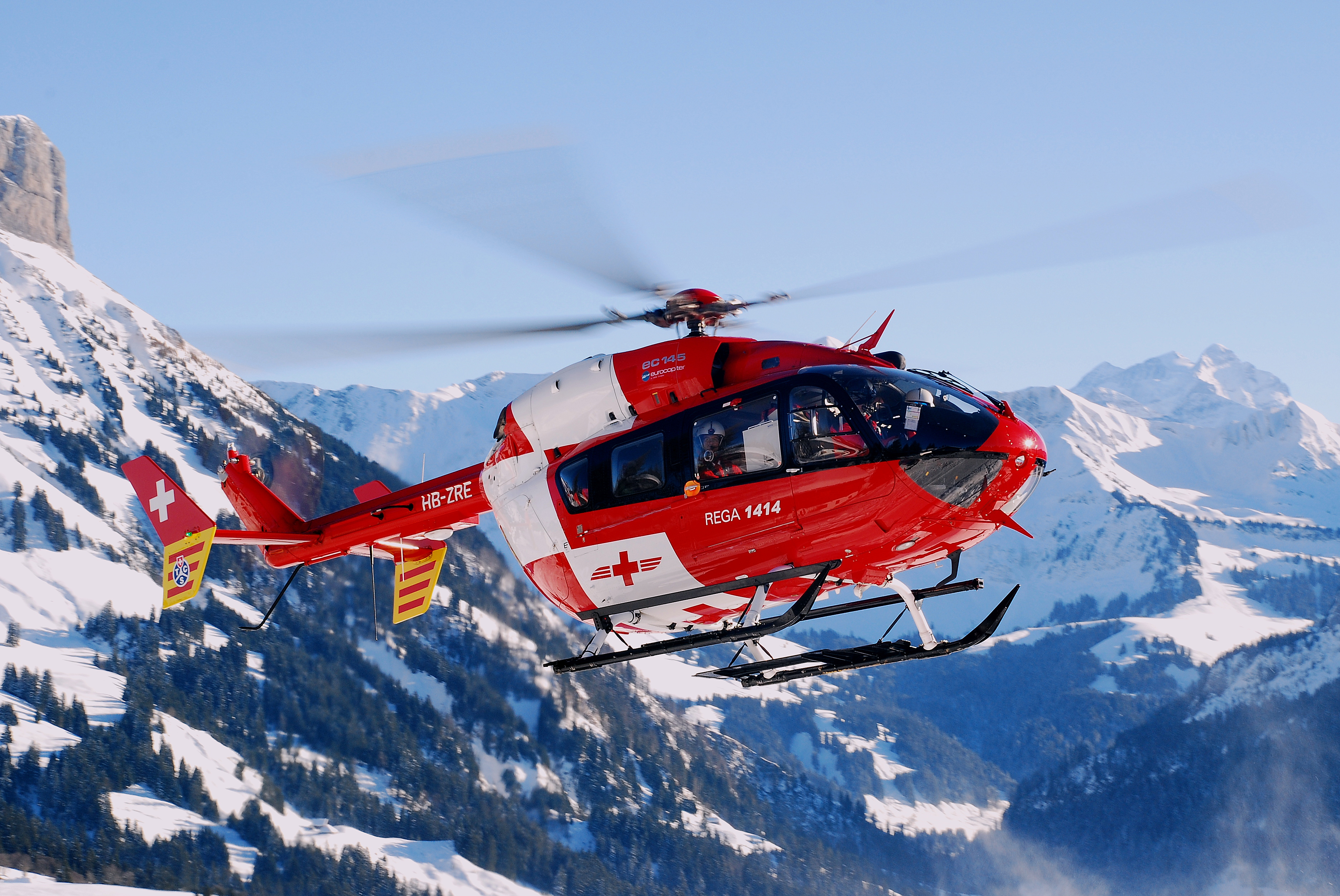
Eurocopter EC 145.

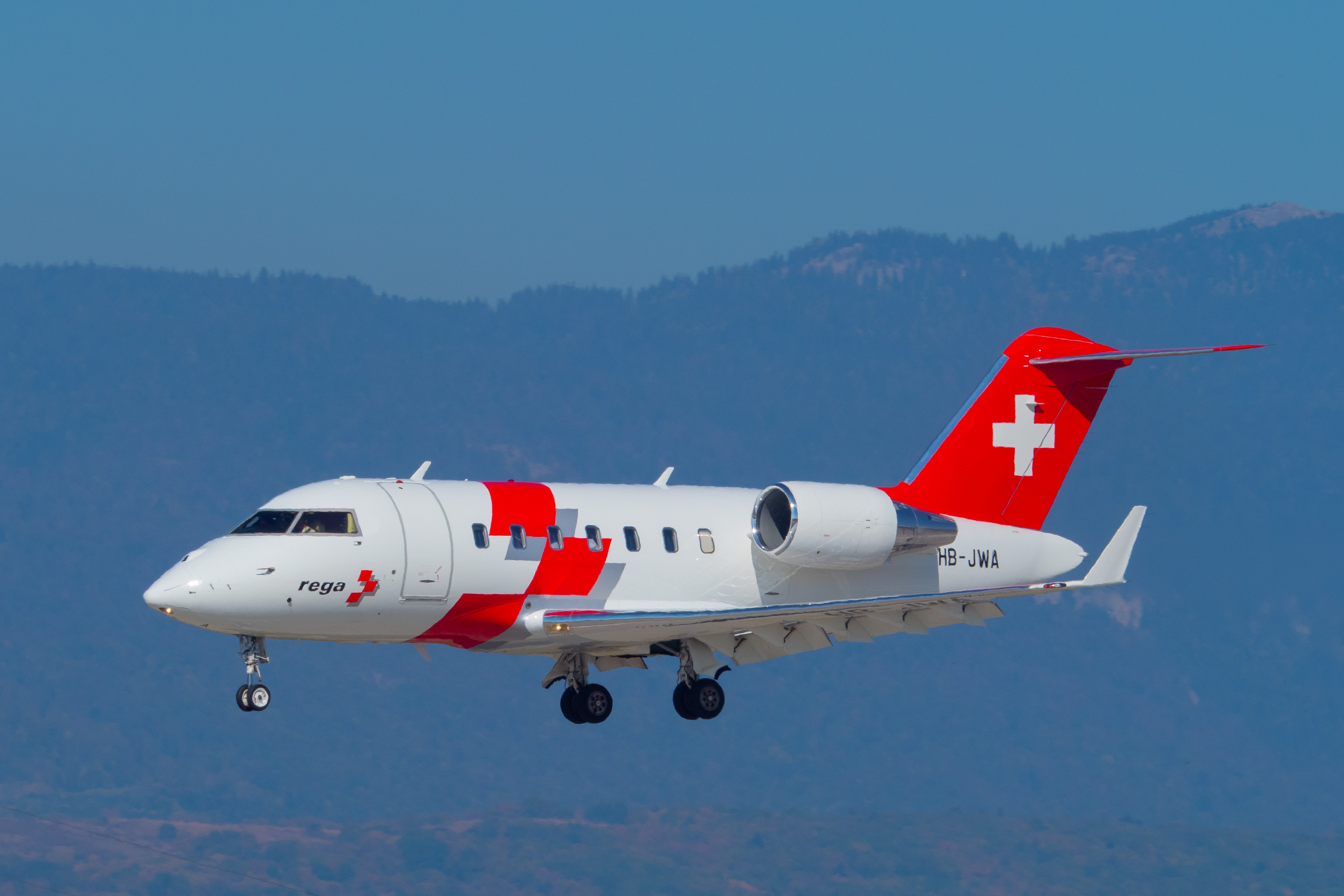
Bombardier CL-650 "Challenger"

=== Current fleet ===
==== Operational fleet ====
The whole fleet will be replaced by the end of 2026. The current fleet has 19 helicopters.

- 11 AW109SP Da Vinci (ordered in 2009).
- 6 Airbus H145 D2 (4-blade rotor), that replaced the EC145, it was ordered in 2016 and delivered in 2018-19.
- 1 Airbus H145 D3 HB-ZOO, ordered in 2018.
- 1 Airbus H145 D3 (5-blade rotor), first of its kind delivered in December 2024, 20 more to be delivered by 2026.

==== Rescue fleet ====
- 1 Airbus Helicopters H125, since end of 2016 for training flights

=== Future fleet (by the end of 2026) ===
21 H145 D3 (5-blade rotor)

- 9 ordered in March 2022 to replace the 6 H145 D2 and the 1 H145 D3 HB-ZOO.
- 12 ordered February 2023 to succeed to the AW109SP Da Vinci used in mountain operations.
- December 2022, approval for the complete renewal of the fleet towards the H145 D3 (5-blade rotor). The order was placed in February 2023, and this order intends to replace the AW109SP Da Vinci used in mountain operations.

=== Recently retired helicopters ===
- The Agusta A109 K2 entered service in August 1992. It was replaced by 11 AW109SP Da Vinci for mountain operations, and by 6 EC145 for plain operation.
- 6 Eurocopter EC145 ordered in 2001, retired in 2019/20, sold with its equipment to the Moroccan Gendarmerie to be used as rescue helicopter.
  - 5 delivered in November 2019.
  - 1 retired in August 2020, and delivered to Morocco.
- 4 H145 sold in February 2024 for the sale of GCH Aviation air rescue ambulance services in New Zealand. The delivery will take place once the new generation of H145 enters service.
  - 3 H145 D2
  - 1 H145 D3 HB-ZOO

== Aircraft fleet ==
The whole fleet is made of:

- 3 Bombardier CL-650 "Challenger", stationed at Zurich Airport

Additionally, Rega has purchased a full-flight simulator to train pilots for its Bombardier Challenger 650 fleet.

== Partners ==
Rega work closely with several organizations and emergency services including the police, fire and ambulance services. It assists in rescue efforts related to road accidents with the Touring Club Suisse TCS. For alpine search, rescue and recovery operations, Rega works closely with rescue branch of the Swiss Alpine Club. For larger operations, Rega may request additional helicopters from the FOCA or the Swiss Accident Investigation Board (SAIB, German acronym SUST) (formerly Aircraft Accident Investigation Bureau).

Rega is a partner of the Swiss Air Force, which supports Rega with helicopters and personnel when necessary. For search-and-rescue flights in difficult conditions, the Air Force has a FLIR-equipped helicopter (usually Eurocopter AS332 Super Puma or Cougar) on call. The Air Force continually monitors the airspace and directs emergency signals immediately to Rega. Aircraft equipment of the Swiss Air Force is used to gain a rapid and precise location of an emergency signal that is transmitted to the Rega helicopter early in an emergency mission. Rega also has access to the Air Force radio system for comprehensive radio coverage, which has a larger coverage area than civil aviation radio.
