= Ursula Bühler Hedinger =

Swiss aviation pioneer (1943–2009)

- Born: Ursula Bühler; 20 June 1943; Zürich, Switzerland
- Died: 3 January 2009 (aged 65); Zürich, Switzerland
- Known for: Swiss aviation pioneer

Ursula Bühler Hedinger (20 June 1943 – 3 January 2009) was a Swiss aviation pioneer. She was the first woman from Switzerland to hold a license to fly a jet. She was also the first Swiss female flight instructor. For over 25 years, she flew for the Swiss Air-Rescue (REGA). She also established a reputation as an acrobatics pilot.

== Early life ==
Ursula Bühler was born in Zürich in 1943. Her father was the entrepreneur Fritz Bühler. She grew up with her brother two years her senior. When she was five years old, her mother suffered a serious accident and became physically disabled. When Ursula Bühler was 13 years old, her mother died. After her mother's death, she ran away from home for the first time. She hitchhiked across Europe.

== Flying career ==
At the age of 16, she found employment as a cleaner on board a freighter and travelled to America. This journey shaped her, and she decided to become a navigator. Back in Switzerland, she applied unsuccessfully to Swissair. She trained as a laboratory chemist until she was hired by the airline as a flight attendant. During this time, she started flying in Basel. Although she lacked the financial means, she took flying lessons and passed the private pilot examination with which she earned a private pilot license. However, she wanted to become a commercial pilot. Her father, who had meanwhile become a manager at REGA, first refused her request for financial support. He changed his mind later and helped her to obtain a professional pilot license.

In 1968, Ursula Bühler again applied unsuccessfully as a pilot at Swissair. Instead, she became an acrobatics pilot and flight instructor. She married one of her first flight students, Hans Hedinger, in 1970. In 1973, REGA bought its first jet-powered aircraft, a Learjet. Together with her father, Ursula Bühler transported the machine from the United States to Switzerland. For more than 25 years, she transported people who had had an accident or were seriously ill from abroad back to Switzerland. In her life, she flew to over 2000 airfields all over the world without accidents.

== Personal life ==
Ursula Bühler and her husband Hans Hedinger had two children, a son and a daughter. The son worked as a flight engineer for Swissair.

Ursula Bühler Hedinger died of cancer in 2009 at the age of 66.
