= AgustaWestland AW109 =

Turbine helicopter by Leonardo

AW109
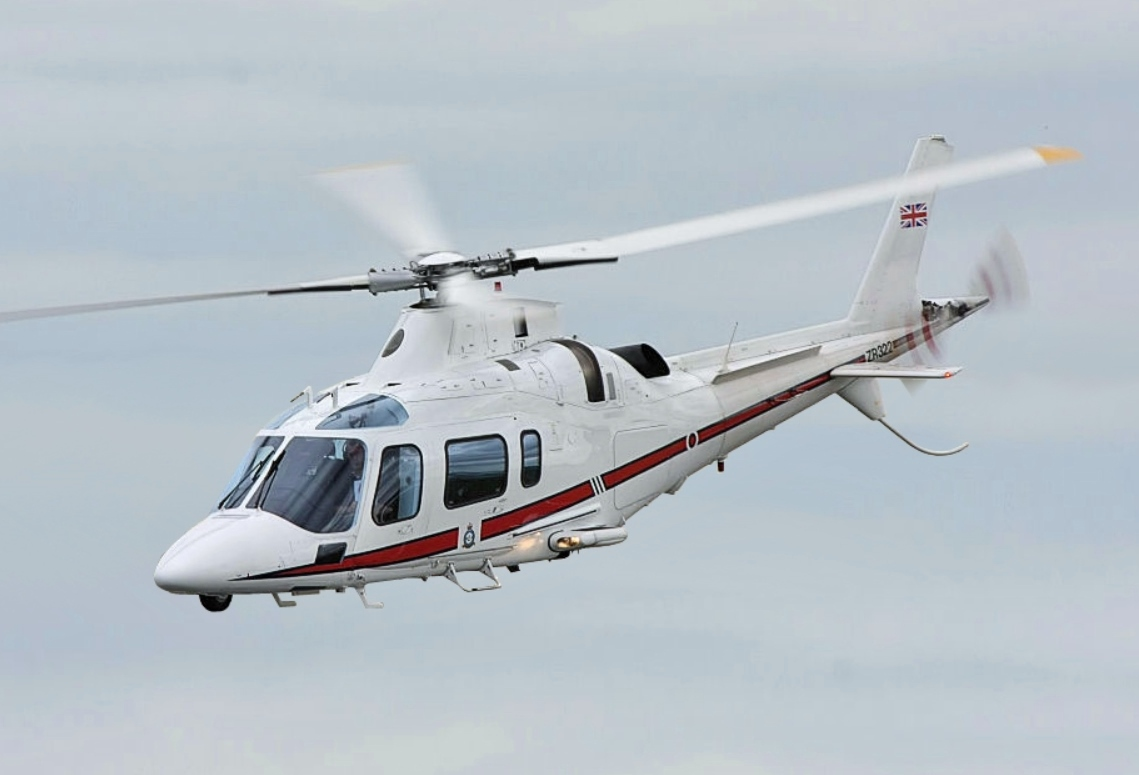
- An AW109E formerly operated by No. 32 Squadron RAF in 2012

General information
- Type: Search and rescue/utility helicopter
- Manufacturer: Agusta; AgustaWestland; Leonardo
- Status: In production
- Primary users: Italian Army Rega (Swiss Air Rescue); South African Air Force; Royal New Zealand Air Force

History
- Manufactured: 1971–present
- Introduction date: 1976
- First flight: 4 August 1971
- Variant: AgustaWestland AW109S Grand
- Developed into: AgustaWestland AW119 Koala

The AgustaWestland AW109, originally the Agusta A109, is a lightweight, twin-engine, eight-seat multi-purpose helicopter designed and initially produced by the Italian rotorcraft manufacturer Agusta. It was the first all-Italian helicopter to be mass-produced. Its production has been continued by Agusta's successor companies,formerly AgustaWestland, merged into the new Finmeccanica since 2016, presently Leonardo.

Development of the A109 commenced during the late 1960s as an indigenous rotorcraft suited to commercial operations. A twin-engine arrangement was pursued in response to market interest, while work on the civil model was prioritised over the military-orientated A109B project. On 4 August 1971, the first of three prototypes made its maiden flight. On 1 June 1975, the type received certification from the Federal Aviation Administration (FAA), permitting its service entry in 1976. The A109 has been used in a wide variety of roles, including light utility, VIP transport, aeromedical, law enforcement, search and rescue (SAR), and several military roles. Dedicated military models have been produced for both land and sea operations. Several models with alternative engines, expanded fuselages, and alternative equipment fitouts have been produced. Some AW109s feature a convertible interior to quickly adapt the rotorcraft between roles. Various third-party companies also offer adaptions and services for the type.

Following the merger of Agusta and the British company Westland Helicopters to form AgustaWestland, the A109 was rebranded as the AW109. International involvement in the programme has also been pursued; the company has established final assembly lines at sites in both Italy and the US. Furthermore, hundreds of AW109 fuselages have been manufactured by the Polish aerospace company PZL-Świdnik since the mid-1990s. AgustaWestland formed a joint venture with the Changhe Aircraft Industries Corporation in 2004 that produces and supports the AW109, includes a final assembly line, in China. The AW109 has been in continuous production for 40 years. The AgustaWestland AW119 is a derivative of the AW109, the principal difference being that it is powered by a single engine and has a fixed undercarriage.

== Development ==
=== Origins ===
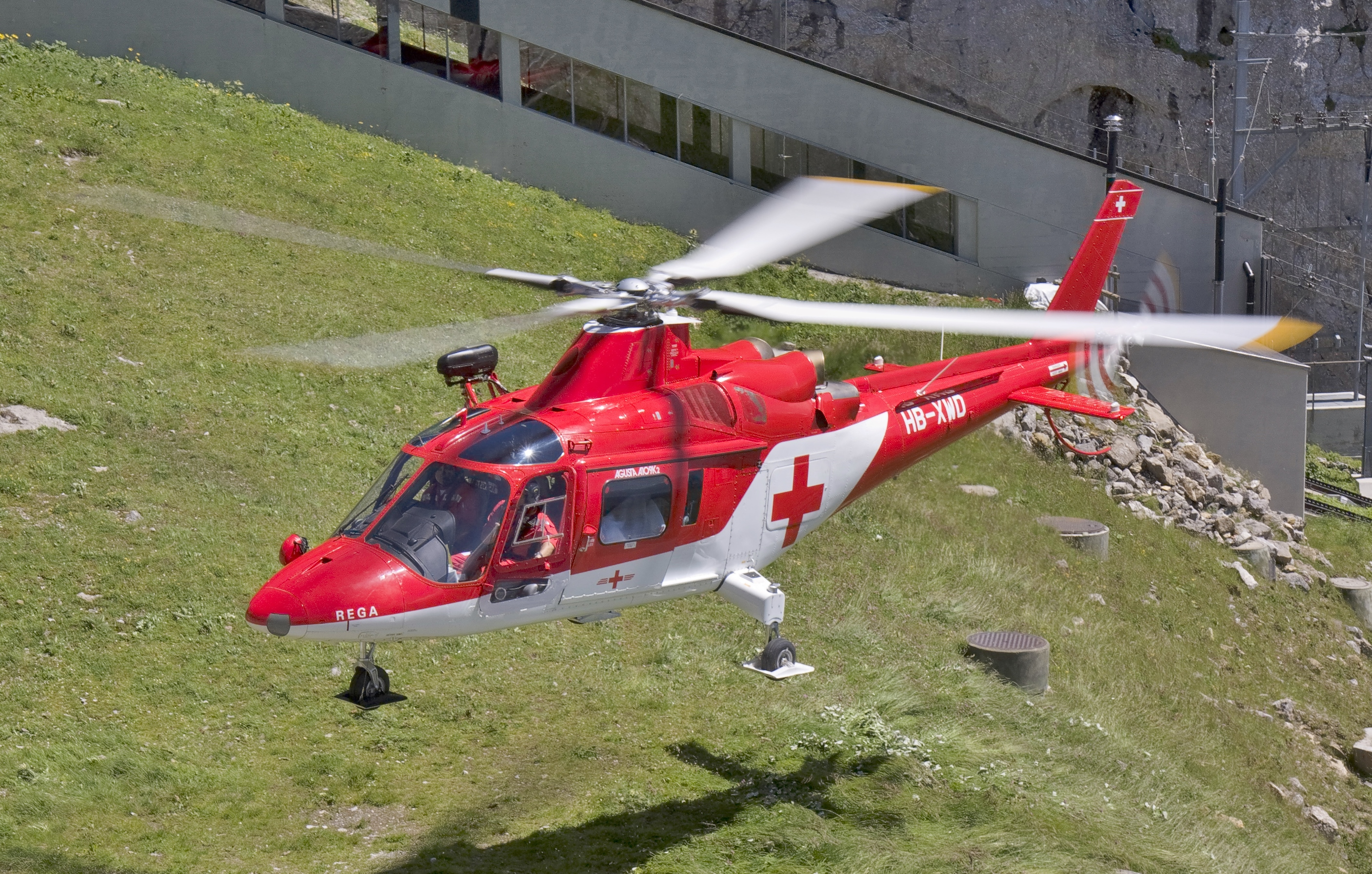
Agusta A109 K2 of the Rega over Mount Pilatus

Work on what would become the AW109 commenced during the late 1960s at the Italian helicopter manufacturer Agusta, which sought to design an indigenous rotorcraft suitable for commercial activities. Known as the A109, early designs were of a single-engine helicopter. However, the design team came to recognise that the market found a twin-engine rotorcraft more attractive, so the project was revised in 1969, to outfit it with a pair of Allison 250-C14 turboshaft engines. While early considerations had been made for a militarised model, which the company internally referred to as the A109B, Agusta intentionally placed a low priority on the work for this variant in favour of other market sectors. In particular, design efforts were concentrated on the eight-seat A109C model.

On 4 August 1971, the first of three prototypes performed the type's maiden flight. The A109 was subject to a protracted flight testing phase, which was largely attributable to the discovery of dynamic instability that took roughly one year to resolve via a modified transmission design. Almost four years later, the first production helicopter was officially completed during April 1975. On 1 June 1975, the type received certification for visual flight rules (VFR) from the Federal Aviation Administration (FAA), permitting the A109 to be operated in North America.

During 1976, deliveries of production A109s commenced to civil customers. The type offered several advantages over the then-market leading Bell 206, including its greater top speed, twin-engine redundancy, and increased seating capacity. In 1975, Agusta's design team revisited the concept of a military version; to support their work, a series of flying trials were carried out between 1976 and 1977 involving a total of five A109As that had been outfitted with Hughes Aircraft-built TOW missiles. From these endeavours, two different military versions of the A109 emerged, one being intended for light attack/close air support missions while the other was optimised for shipboard operations.

=== Further development ===
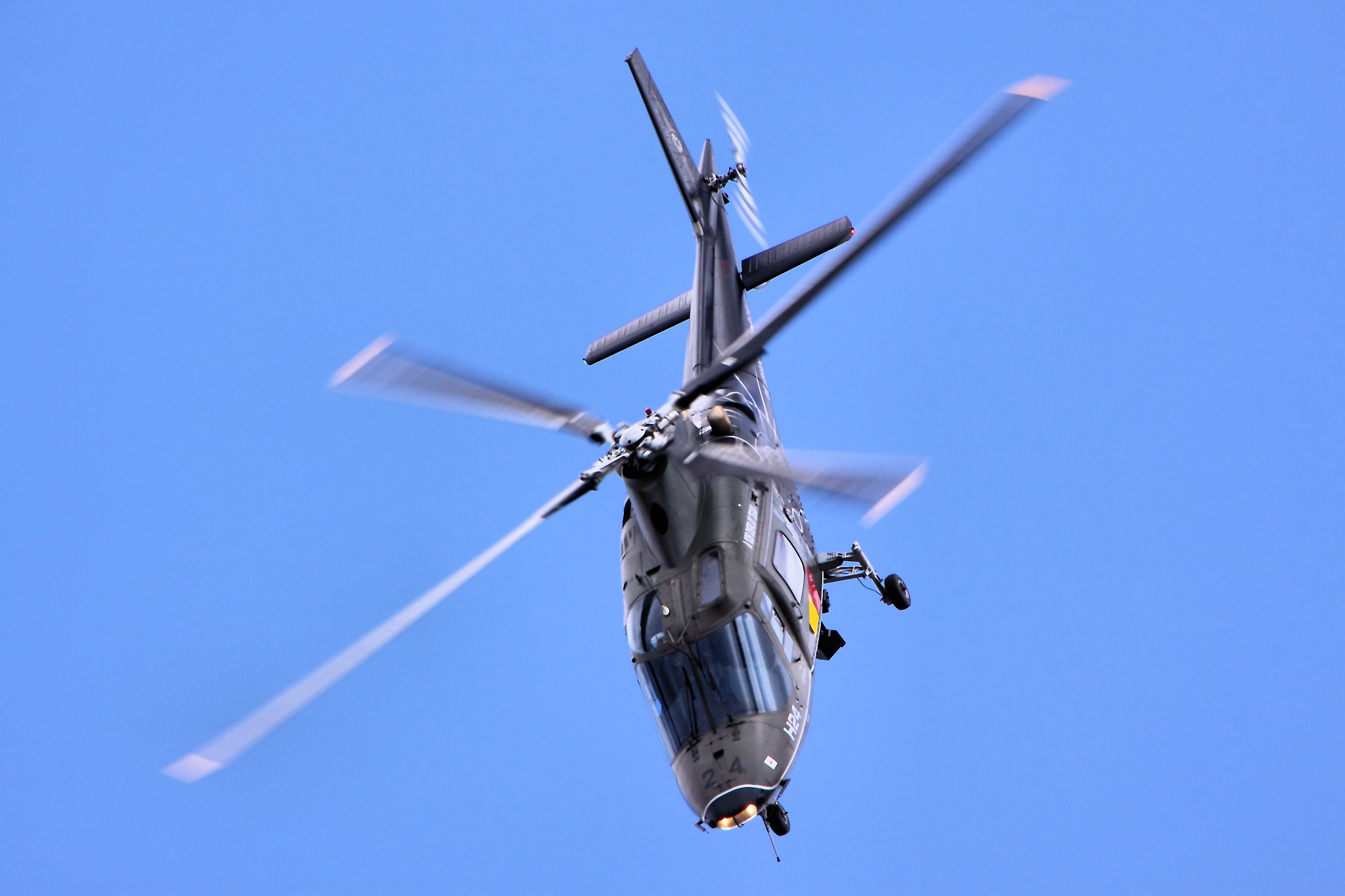
A Belgian A109BA performing a display flight, 2013

Shortly following after the launch of the initial production model, Agusta begun work on additional models, primarily for the civil sector. During 1981, an A109A Mk2, that featured a widened cabin, was made available to operators. In 1993, the A109 K2 model was introduced, which was powered by alternative engine in the form of the Turbomeca Arriel 1K1. During 1996, the A109 Power was launched, which was broadly similar to the K2 except for the adoption of yet another powerplant, the Pratt & Whitney Canada PW206 engine. By 2008, according to AgustaWestland, the A109 Power was being operated across 46 countries. In 2006, an enlarged variant, the A109S Grand, was introduced.

The A109 was renamed the AW109 as a consequence of the July 2000 merger of Finmeccanica and GKN plc's respective helicopter subsidiaries Agusta and Westland Helicopters to form AgustaWestland. Since the mid-1990s, fuselages for the AW109 have been manufactured by PZL-Świdnik, which became a subsidiary company of AgustaWestland in 2010. In June 2006, the 500th fuselage was delivered by the Polish aerospace company PZL-Świdnik, marking 10 years of co-operation on the AW109 between the two companies. In 2004, AgustaWestland formed a joint venture with the Changhe Aircraft Industries Corporation for the support and production of the AW109 in China; by 2009, the joint venture was reportedly capable of performing the final assembly of the AW109 in addition to independently manufacturing major sections, such as the fuselage.

In February 2014, AgustaWestland announced the development of the AW109 Trekker, an updated model. It is equipped with skid landing gear (being the first twin-engine helicopter produced by the company to have this feature) and is powered by a pair of FADEC-equipped Pratt & Whitney Canada PW207C engines; its avionics are supplied by Genesys Aerospace, which have been designed for single-pilot operations. The Trekker reportedly expands upon the utility capabilities of the standard AW109. Akin to the prior models, the final assembly of the AW109 Trekker is undertaken at sites in both the US and Italy.

=== Indian manufacturing line ===
Adani Defence & Aerospace signed another memorandum of understanding with Leonardo for the strategic partnership to establish India's helicopter manufacturing ecosystem. The companies will setup an assembly line for AW169M and AW109 TrekkerM helicopters with phased indigenisation as well as MRO facilities. This is meant to fulfil the requirement of over 1,000 helicopters by the Indian Armed Forces.

The TrekkerM will be offered for the reconnaissance and surveillance helicopters (RSH) tender for 200 helicopters of the Indian Army and Air Force against HAL Light Utility Helicopter, Bell 407, and Airbus H125. A joint reply for the tender has been sent to the Indian Defense Ministry. The ecosystem will also serve the domestic civilian market demand.

== Design ==
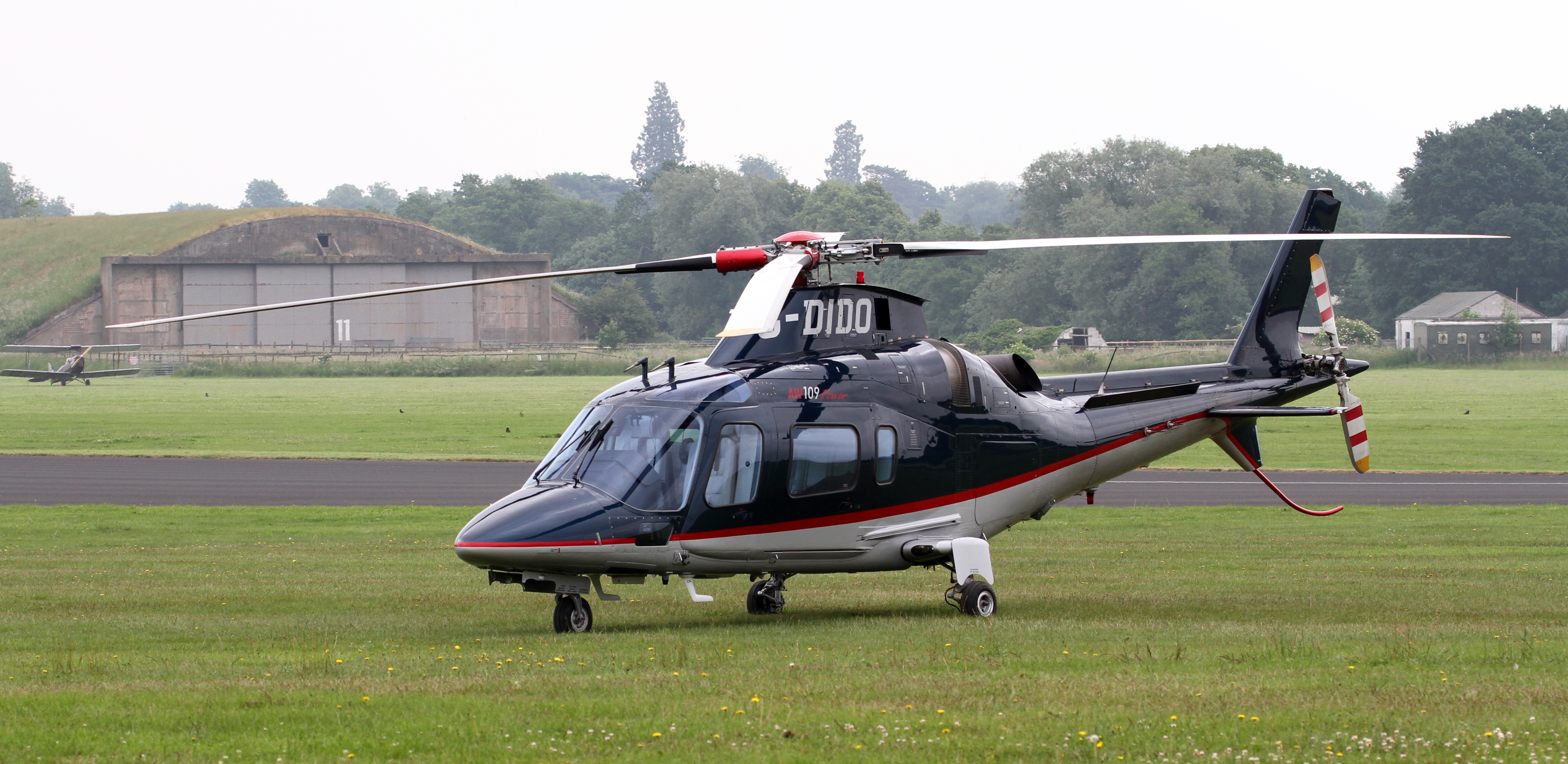
An A109E parked on the grass

The AW109 is a lightweight twin-engine helicopter, known for its speed, elegant appearance and ease of control. Since entering commercial service, several revisions and iterations have been made, frequently introducing new avionics and engine technologies. AgustaWestland have promoted the type for its multirole capabilities and serviceability. The type has proven highly popular with VIP/corporate customers; according to AgustaWestland, 50% of all of the AW109 Power variant had been sold in such configurations. Other roles for the AW109 have included emergency medical services, law enforcement, homeland security missions, harbor pilot shuttle duty, search and rescue, maritime operations, and military uses.

A range of turboshaft powerplants have been used to power the numerous variants of the AW109, from the original Allison 250-C14 engines to the Turbomeca Arriel 1K1 and Pratt & Whitney Canada PW206 of more modern aircraft. Powerplants can be replaced or swapped for during airframe overhauls, resulting in increasing lifting capacity and other performance changes. In the case of single-engine failure, the AW109 is intended to have a generous power reserve even on a single engine. The engines drive a fully articulated four-blade rotor system. Over time, more advanced rotor blade designs have been progressively adopted for the AW109's main and tail rotors, such as composite materials being used to replace bonded metal, these improvements have typically been made with the aim of reducing operating costs and noise signature. According to Rotor&Wing, the type is well regarded for its "high, hot, and heavy" performance.

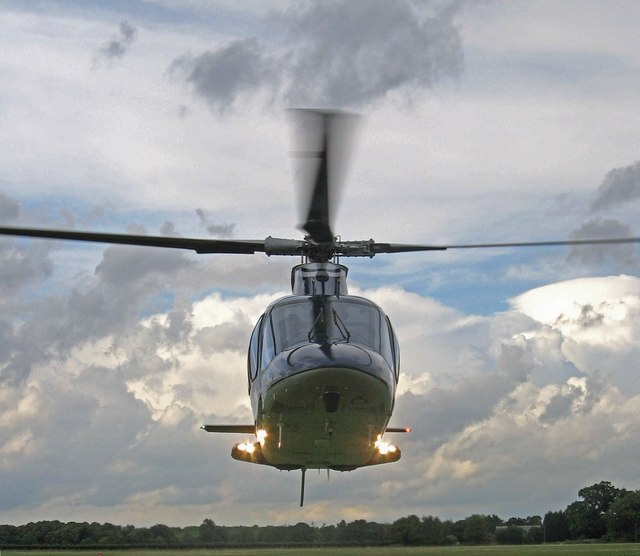
Head-on view of a low-flying AW109E, 2008

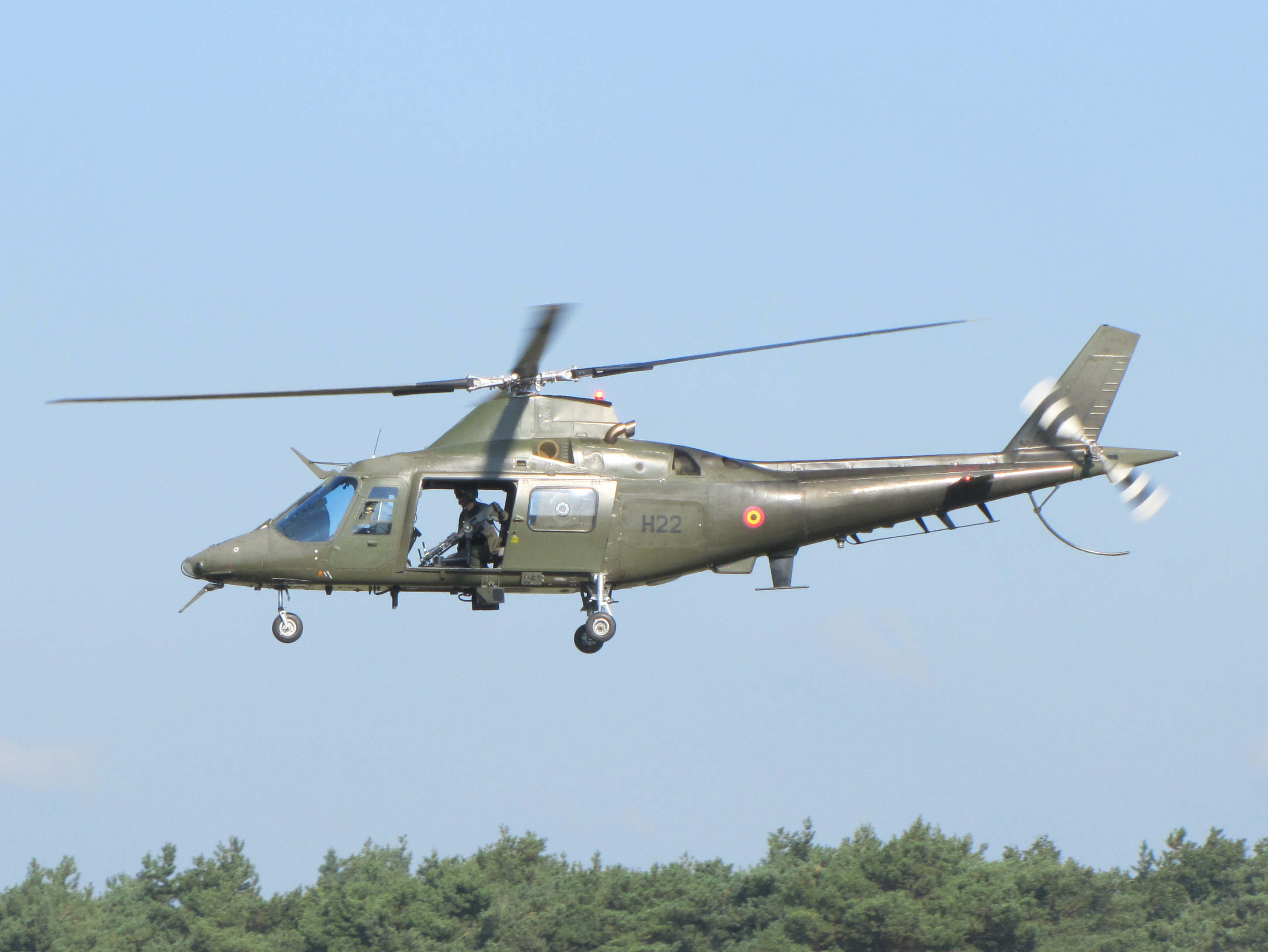
A109 in Belgian military service

According to AgustaWestland, the AW109 Power features various advanced avionics systems, these include a three-axis autopilot, an auto-coupled Instrument Landing System, integrated GPS, a Moving Map Display, weather radar, and a Traffic Alerting System. These systems are designed to reduce pilot workload (the AW109 can be flown under single or dual-pilot instrument flight rules (IFR)) and enable the use of night vision goggles (NVG) to conduct day-or-night operations. The AW109 has a forced trim system which can be readily and selectively activated by the controlling pilot using triggers located on the cyclic and collective which hold the control inputs at the last set position if activated. All critical systems are deliberately redundant for fail-safe operations; the hydraulic system, hydraulic actuators, and electrical system are all dual-redundant, while the power inverters are triple-redundant. The AW109 also has reduced maintenance requirements due to an emphasis on reliability across the range of components used.

Some models of the AW109 feature the "quick convertible interior", a cabin configuration designed to be flexibly re-configured to allow the rotorcraft to be quickly adapted for different roles, such as the installation or removal of mission consoles or medical stretchers. Mission-specific equipment can also be installed in the externally accessible separate baggage compartment, which can be optionally expanded. Optional cabin equipment includes soundproofing, air conditioning, and bleed air heating. Aftermarket cabin configurations are offered by third parties; Pininfarina and Versace have both offered designer interiors for the AW109, while Aerolite Max Bucher has developed a lightweight emergency medical service interior. The majority of AW109s are fitted with a retractable wheeled tricycle undercarriage, providing greater comfort than skids and taxiing capability. For shipboard operations, the wheeled landing gear is reinforced, deck mooring points are fixed across the lower fuselage, and extensive corrosion protection is typically applied.

Optional mission equipment for the AW109 has included dual controls, a rotor brake, windshield wipers, a fixed cargo hook, snow skis, external loudspeakers, wire-strike protection system, engine particle separator, engine compartment fire extinguishers, datalink, and rappelling fittings. A range of armaments can be installed upon the AW109, including pintle-mounted machine guns, machine gun pods, 20mm cannons, rocket pods, anti-tank missiles and air-to-air missiles. Those AW109s operated by the U.S. Coast Guard, later designated as MH-68A, had the following equipment installed: a rescue hoist, emergency floats, FLIR, Spectrolab NightSun search light, a 7.62 mm M240D machine gun and a Barrett M107 semi-automatic 12.7 mm (.50 caliber) anti-material rifle with laser sight.

== Operational history ==
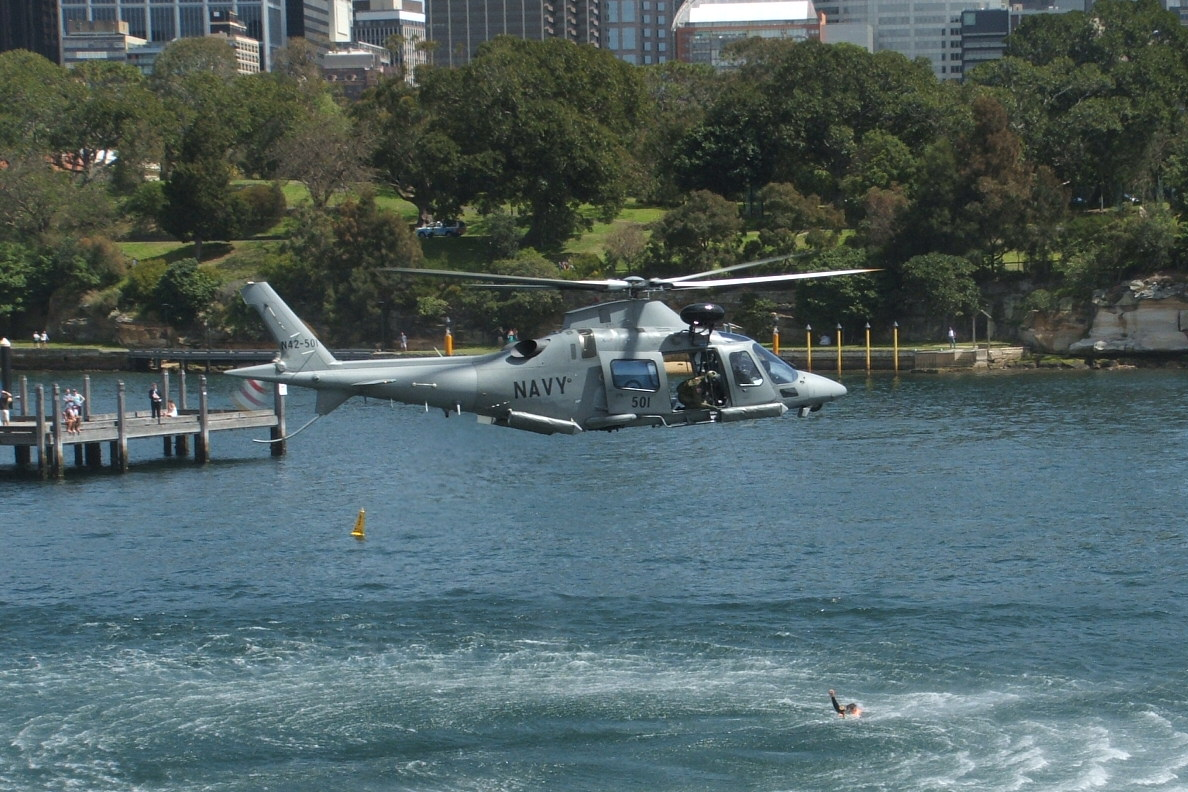
An Australian AW109E during a rescue demonstration, 2008

Various branches of the Italian military have operated variants of the AW109; the Guardia di Finanza has operated its own variant of the AW109 since the 1980s for border patrol and customs duties, by 2010, it was in the process of replacing its original AW109s with a new-generation of AW109s.

During 1982, the Argentine Army Aviation deployed three A109As to the Falkland Islands during the Falklands War. They operated with the helicopter fleet (9 UH-1H, 2 CH-47C and 2 Pumas) in reconnaissance and liaison roles. One of the helicopters was destroyed on the ground by a British Harrier attack; the others were captured and sent to Europe aboard HMS Fearless. The British Army Air Corps decided to use those helicopters in domestic operations (being flown by 8 Flight AAC to support SAS regiment deployments in the UK), alongside two additional A109 which were purchased later following favorable use of the first two; all were retired in 2009. The improved AW109E and SP – GrandNew versions were operated by No. 32 Squadron of the Royal Air Force to transport Government ministers, senior military personnel, and members of the British royal family.

In 1988, 46 A109s were sold to the Belgian Armed Forces; it was later alleged that Agusta had given the Flemish Socialist Party over 50 million Belgian francs as a bribe to secure the sale. The resulting scandal led to the resignation and later conviction of NATO Secretary General Willy Claes. Belgium has operated an A109 aerial display team. In early 2013, a pair of Belgian AW109s were deployed to Sévaré, Mali, to perform medical evacuation mission in support of the French-led Operation Serval. In June 2013, Belgian newspaper La Libre Belgique alleged that several former Belgian military helicopters had been sold via a private company to South Sudan in violation of a European Union embargo on weapons sales.

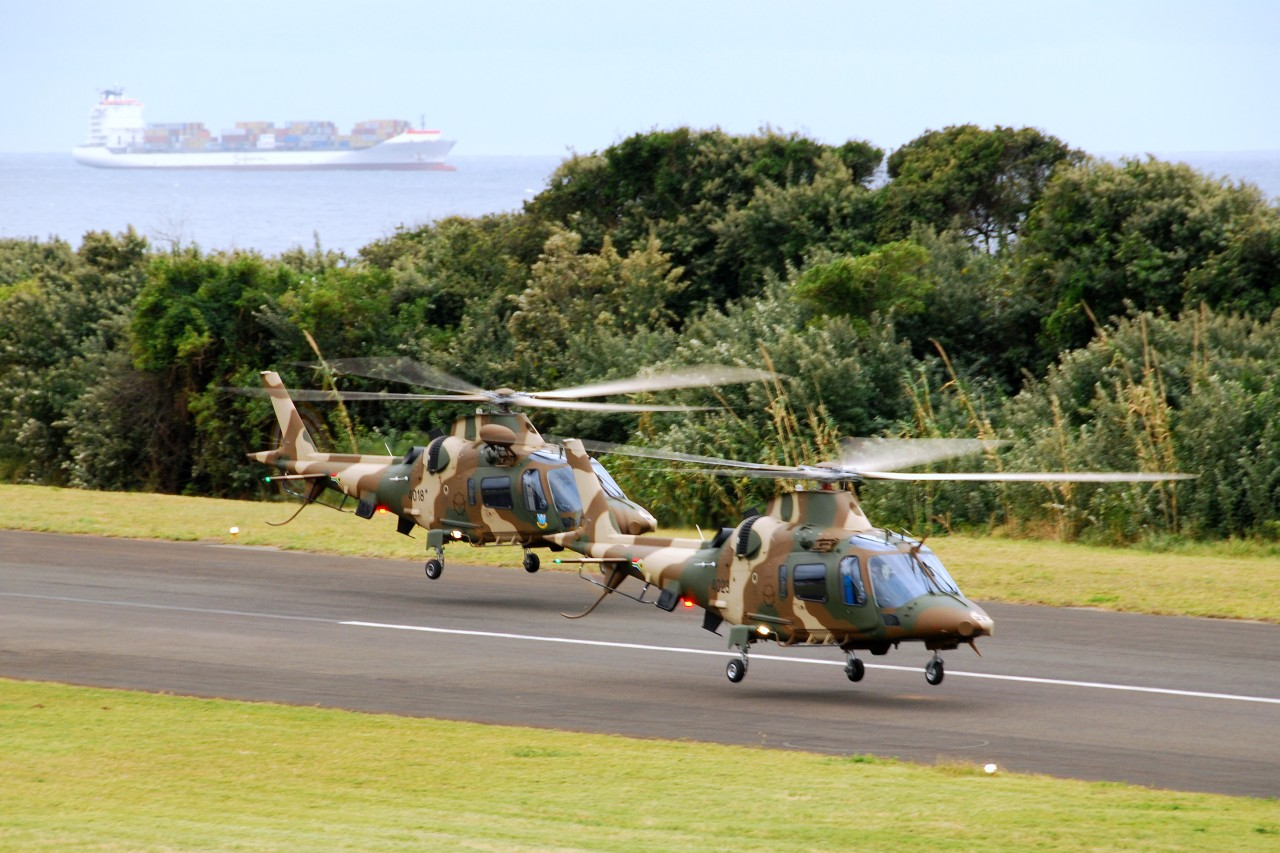
Pair of South African Air Force (SAAF) A109 LUHs landing in formation

During the 1990s, the US Coast Guard, seeking to tackle drug trafficking on small speed boats via armed aerial interdiction helicopters, evaluated several options and selected the AW109 as the winner. For a number of years, eight armed AW109s, designated MH-68A Sting Ray, were leased from AgustaWestland and deployed at Coast Guard land facilities and onboard cutters. Positive experience with the AW109 led to the Coast Guard deciding to arm all of its helicopters and, following adaptions of their existing assets, the AW109s were returned after the lease expired.

In September 1999, the South African Air Force (SAAF) placed an order for 30 AW109s; 25 of the 30 rotorcraft were assembled locally by Denel Aviation, starting in 2003. As many as 16 SAAF AW109s were deployed for patrol, utility, and medical evacuation missions during the 2010 FIFA World Cup. In July 2013, the SAAF reported that 18 AW109s had effectively been grounded due to lack of funding, these rotorcraft being only occasionally activated but not conducting flights; in 2013, only 71 flight hours were allocated to the whole AW109 fleet. The type may be reduced to flying VIPs rather than being operationally capable; South Africa is also considering selling a number of AW109s, and may cease helicopter operations altogether.

In 2001, 20 AW109s were ordered for the Swedish Armed Forces, receiving the Swedish military designation of Hkp 15. In 2010, it was reported that considerable demands were being placed upon the AW109 fleet, in part due to the delayed delivery of the NHIndustries NH90. In early 2015, a pair of Swedish AW109s were deployed on board the Royal Netherlands Navy ship HNLMS Johan de Witt, their first-ever deployment on board a foreign vessel, in support of a multinational anti-piracy mission off the coast of Somalia; the AW109 reportedly achieve a 100% availability rate over the course of three months.

Between 2007 and 2012, three AW109E Power helicopters were operated under lease by the Royal Australian Navy (RAN) to train naval aircrew.

In May 2008, the Royal New Zealand Air Force (RNZAF) placed an order for five AW109LUH rotorcraft to replace their aging Bell 47 Sioux in a training capacity; they are also used in the utility role to complement the larger NHIndustries NH90 and has seen limited use in VIP missions.

During August 2008, Scott Kasprowicz and Steve Sheik broke the round-the-world speed record using a factory-standard AgustaWestland AW109S Grand, with a time of 11 days, 7 hours and 2 minutes. The AW109S Grand is also recorded as being the fastest helicopter from New York to Los Angeles.

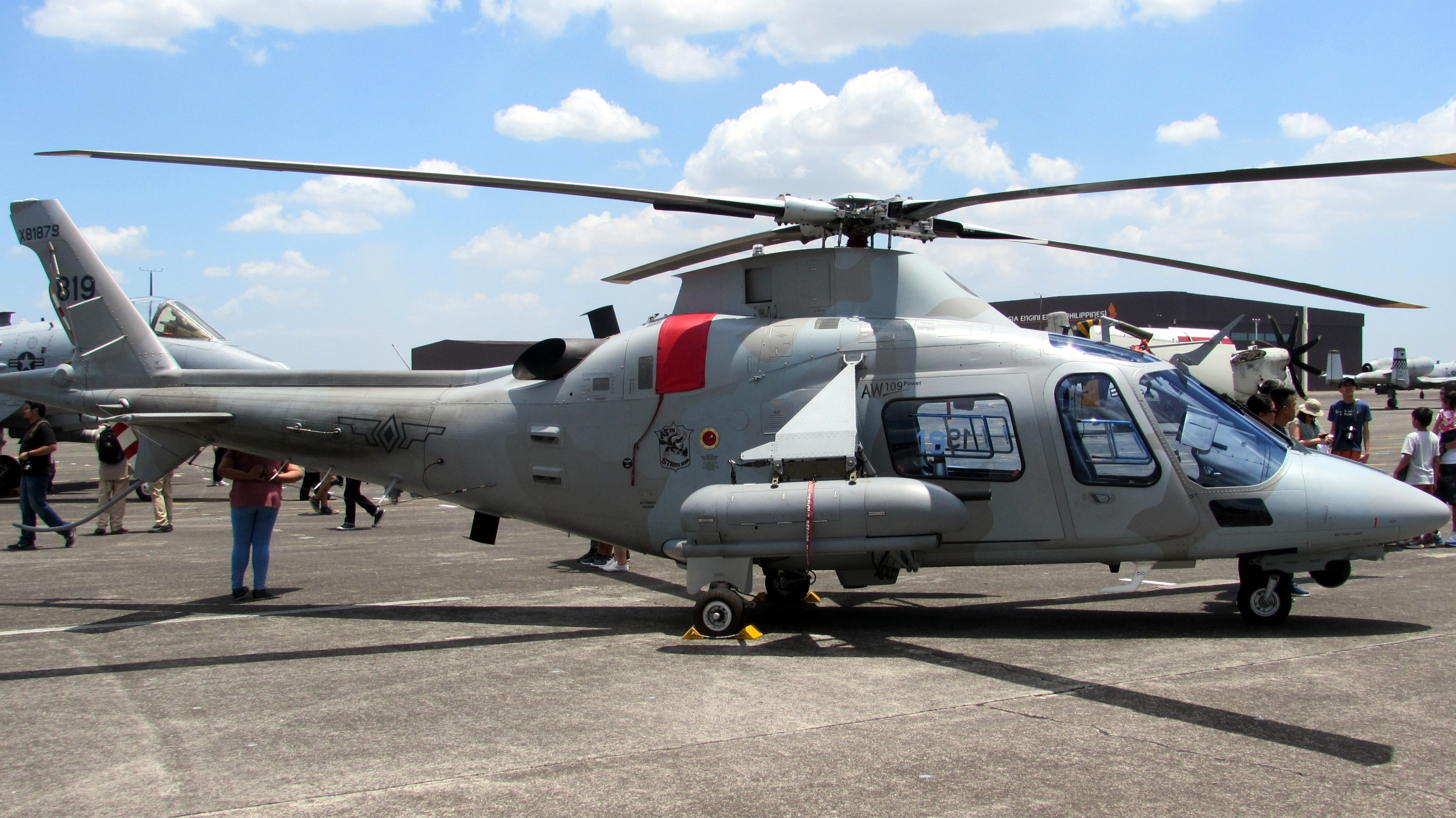
Philippine Air Force AW109 Light Armed Helicopter during the Exercise Balikatan 2016

In 2013, the Philippine Air Force (PAF) and the Philippine Navy independently ordered batches of AW109 Power rotorcraft; additional AW109s were ordered in 2014. The PAF AW109s are used as armed gunships, while both armed and unarmed AW109s are operated by the Philippine Navy. During the Battle of Marawi, multiple PAF AW109s engaged in combat the ISIS-affiliated Maute Group. During November 2020, a PAF AW109 was involved in a joint operation of Armed Forces of the Philippines Joint Task Force (JTF) - Sulu against Abu Sayyaf kidnappers in northern Mindanao, firing upon a boat in conjunction with strafing fire from Philippine Navy Multipurpose Assault Craft.Philippine Naval Air Wing's AW109 helicopter played a key role in the Ground-Based Anti-Ship Missile (GBASM) raid training exercise at Camp Cape Bojeador, Burgos, Ilocos Norte, as part of Exercise KAMANDAG 2025.

== Variants ==
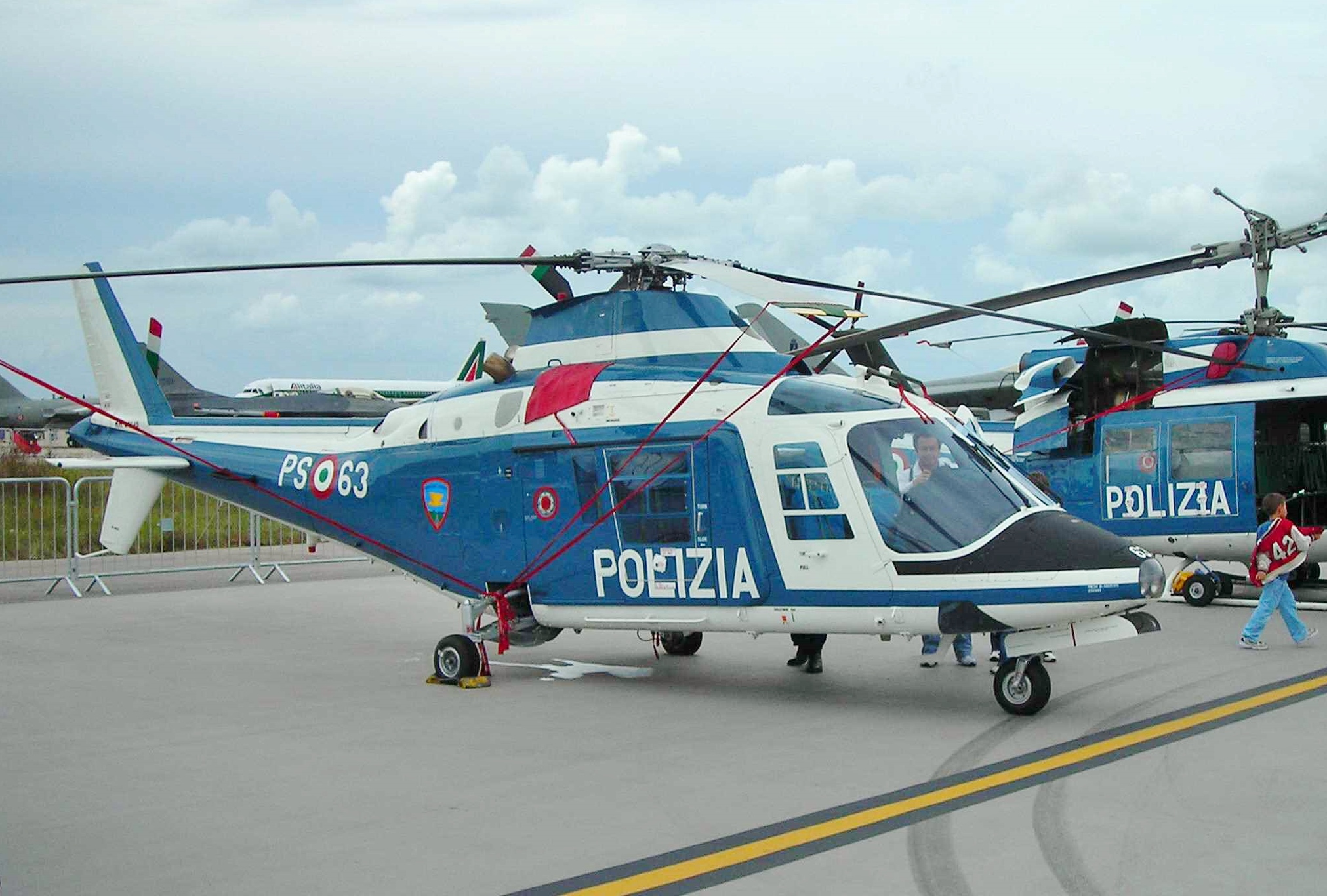
Agusta A109A Mk.II of the Italian police

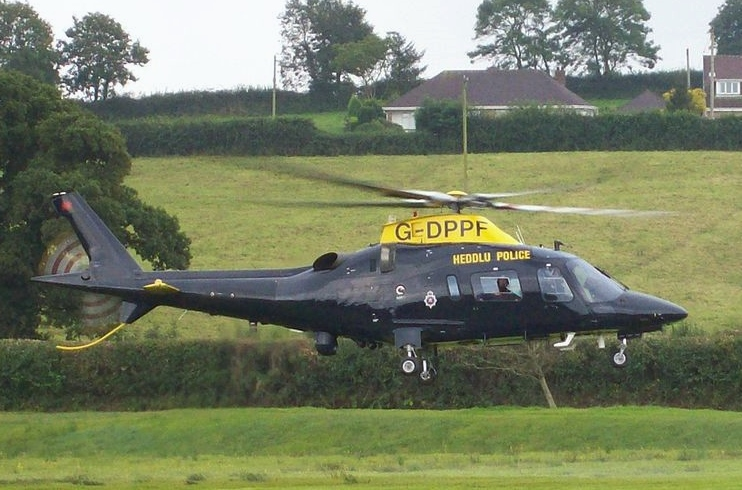
Former Dyfed-Powys Police Air Support Unit Helicopter demonstration at police HQ Open Day 2008

A109A
The first production model, powered by two Allison Model 250-C20 turboshaft engines. It made its first flight on 4 August 1971. Initially, the A109 was marketed under the name of "Hirundo" (Latin for the swallow), but this was dropped within a few years.
A109A EOA
Military version for the Italian Army.
A109A Mk.II
Upgraded civilian version of the A109A.
A109A Mk.II MAX
Aeromedical evacuation version based on A109A Mk.II with extra wide cabin and access doors hinged top and bottom, rather than to one side.
A109B
Unbuilt military version.
A109BA
Version created for the Belgian Army. Based on the A109C but fitted with fixed landing gear, sliding doors and a tail rotor guard in place of a lower tail fin.
A109C
Eight-seat civil version, powered by two Allison Model 250-C20R-1 turboshaft engines.
A109C MAX
Aeromedical evacuation version based on A109C with extra-wide cabin and access doors hinged top and bottom, rather than to one side.
A109D
One prototype only
A109E Power
Upgraded civilian version, initially powered by two Turbomeca Arrius 2K1 engines. Later the manufacturer introduced an option for two Pratt & Whitney PW206C engines to be used – both versions remain known as the A109E.
A109E Power Elite
A stretched cabin version of A109E Power. Features a glass cockpit with two complete sets of pilot instruments and navigation systems, including a three-axis autopilot, an auto-coupled Instrument Landing System and GPS.
A109LUH
Military LUH "Light Utility Helicopter" variant based on the A109E Power. Operators include South African Air Force, Swedish Air Force, Royal New Zealand Air Force, Nigerian Air Force, as well as Algeria and Malaysia. Known as the Hkp15A (utility variant) and 15B (ship-borne search and rescue variant) with the Swedish Air Force.

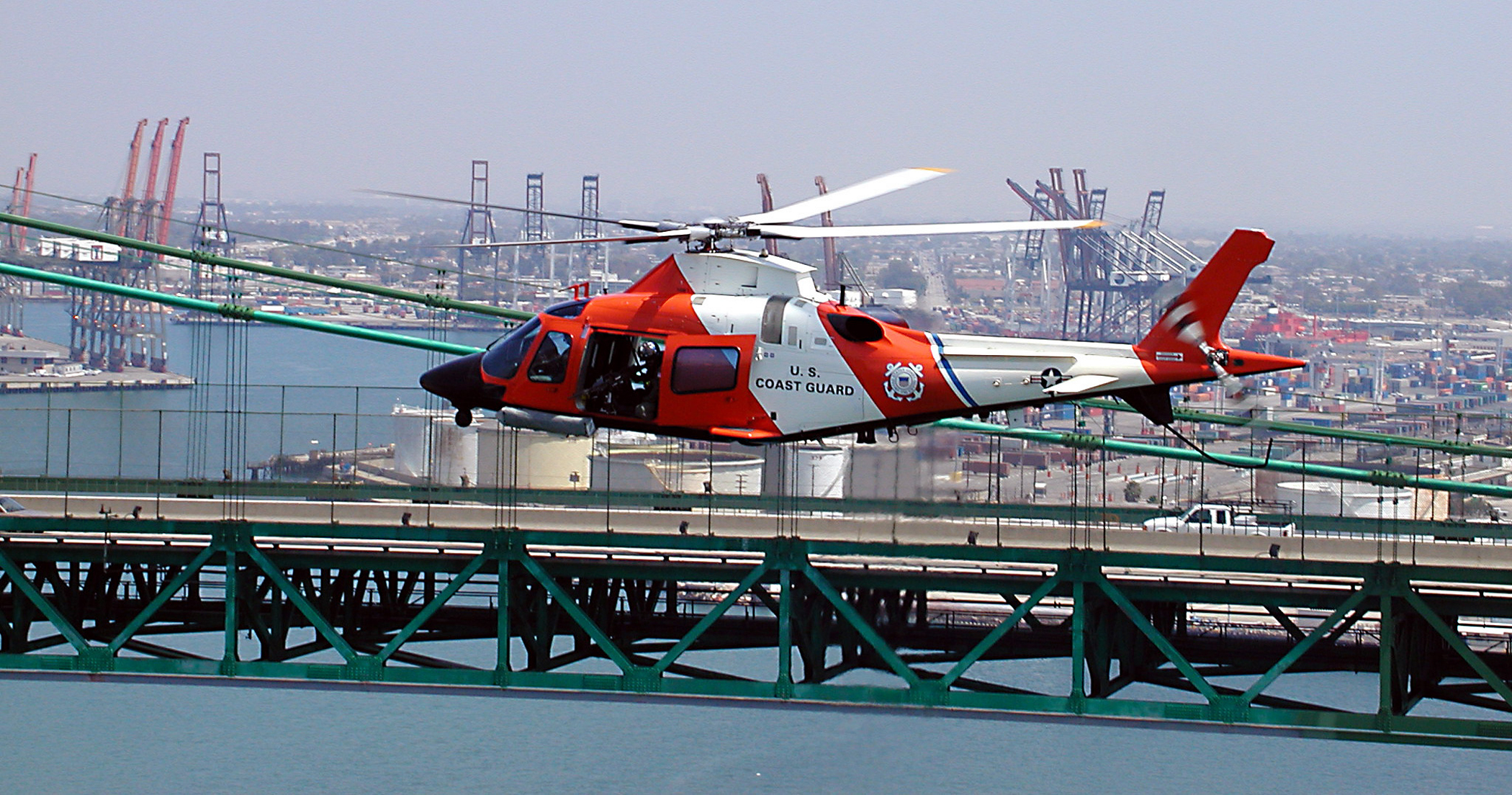
MH-68A on Patrol in Los Angeles Harbor, California

MH-68A Stingray
Eight A109E Power aircraft were used by the United States Coast Guard Helicopter Interdiction Tactical Squadron Jacksonville (HITRON Jacksonville) as short-range armed interdiction helicopters from 2000 until 2008, when they were replaced with MH-65C Dolphins. Agusta named this type "Mako", until the U.S. Coast Guard officially named it the MH-68A Stingray in 2003. The helicopters were armed with M-16 rifles, M-240 machine gun, and a MC-50 rifle with laser sight; in addition, night operations were supported by ANVIS-9 Night Vision Goggles linked to the ANVIS-7 heads-up display (HUD) system.
A109K
Military version.
A109K2
High-altitude and high-temperature operations with fixed wheels rather than the retractable wheels of most A109 variants. Typically used by police, search and rescue, and air ambulance operators.
A109M
Military version.
A109 km
Military version for high altitude and high temperature operations.
A109KN
Naval version.

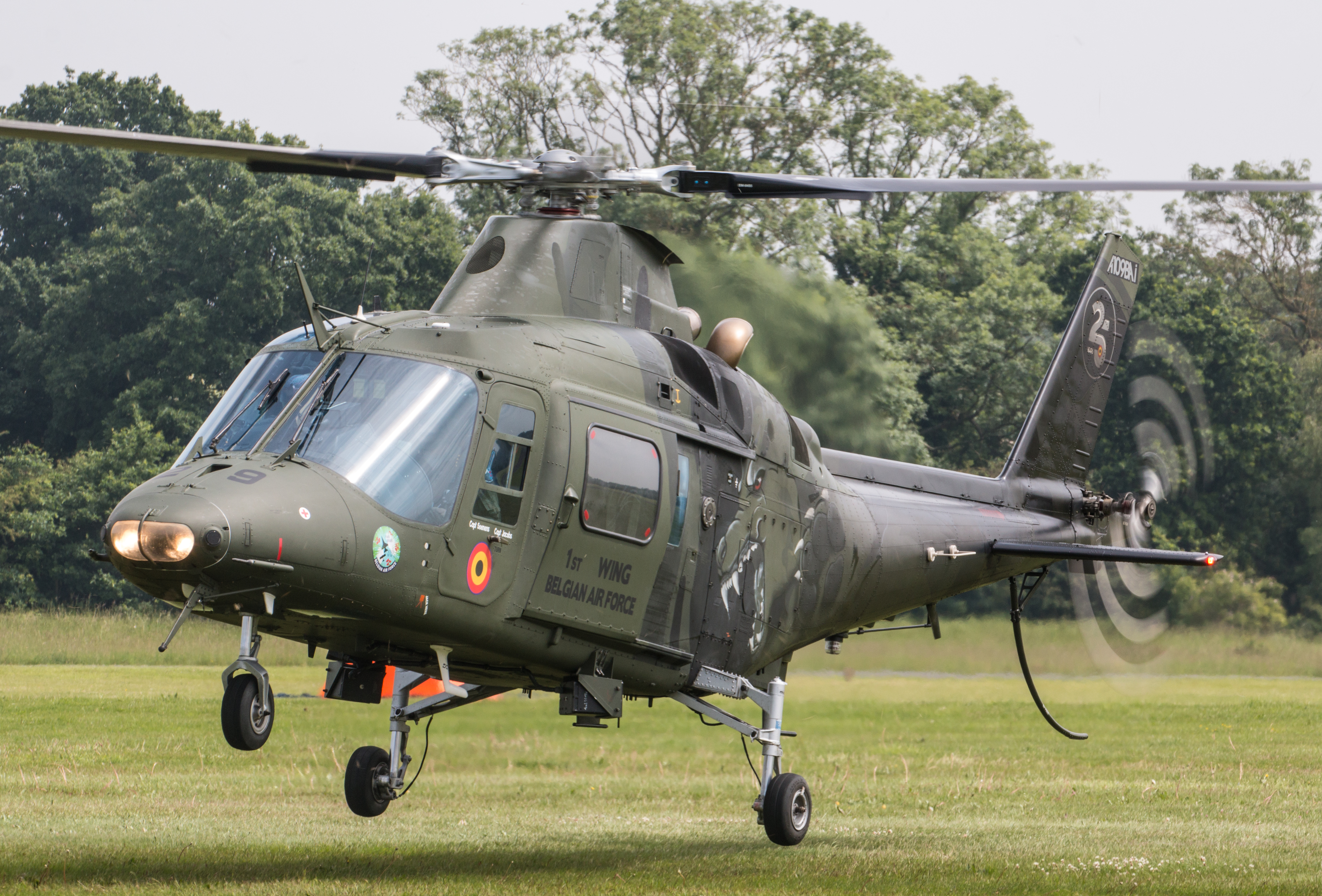
A109 of the Belgian Air Force

A109CM
Standard military version.
A109GdiF
Version for Guardia di Finanza, the Italian Finance Guard.
A109S Grand
Marketed as the AW109 Grand, it is a lengthened cabin-upgraded civilian version with two Pratt & Whitney Canada PW207 engines and lengthened main rotor blades with different tip design from the Power version.
AW109SP
AW109 GrandNew
single pilot IFR, TAWS and EVS, especially for EMS.
AW109 Trekker
A variant of the AW109S Grand with fixed landing skids.
CA109
Chinese model of the AW109E for China mainland market by Jiangxi Changhe Agusta Helicopter Co., Ltd., a Leonardo Helicopter Division(formerly AgustaWestland) and Changhe Aviation Industries Joint Venture Company established in 2005.

== Operators ==
The AW109 is flown by a range of operators including private companies, military services, emergency services and air charter companies.

=== Military and government operators ===
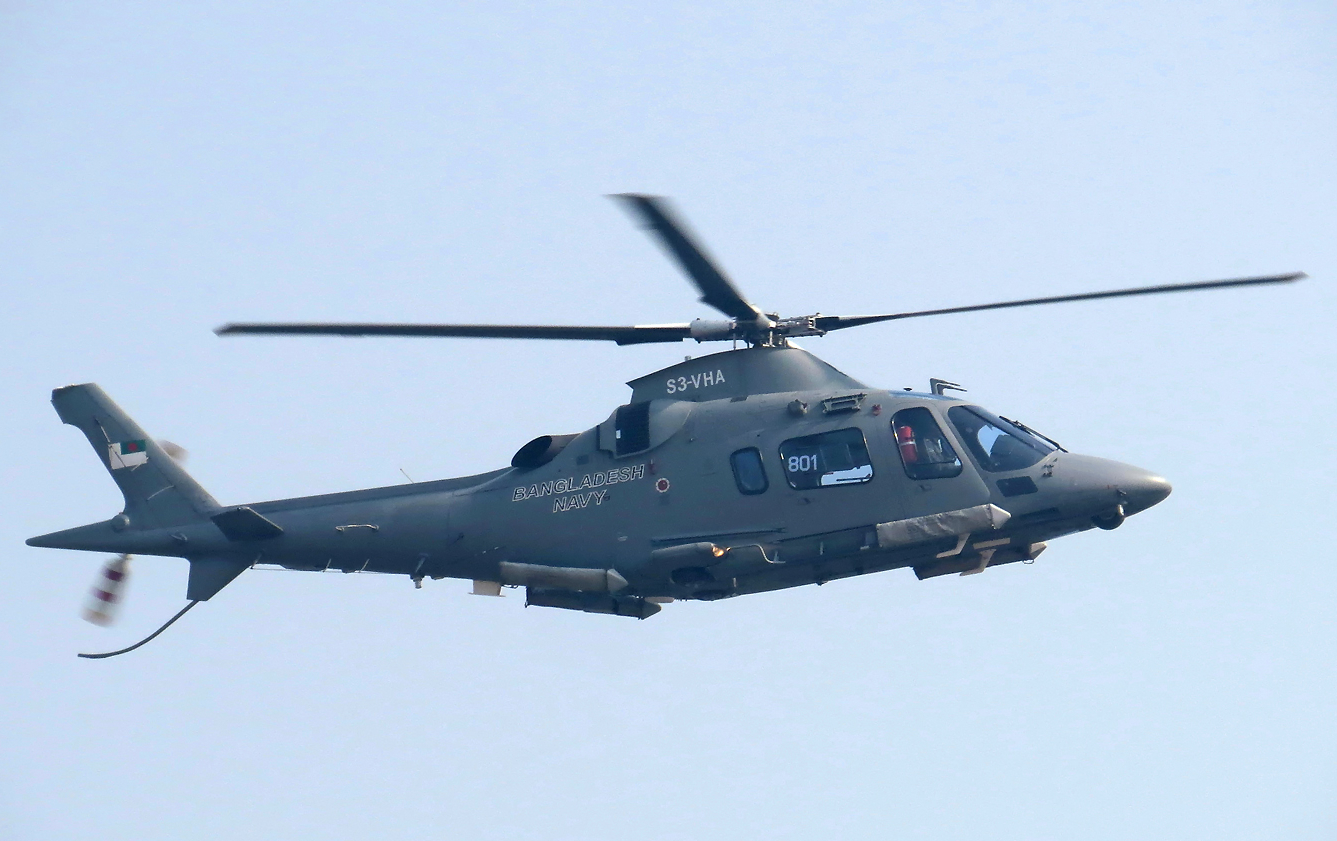
AW109E Power operated by Bangladesh Navy

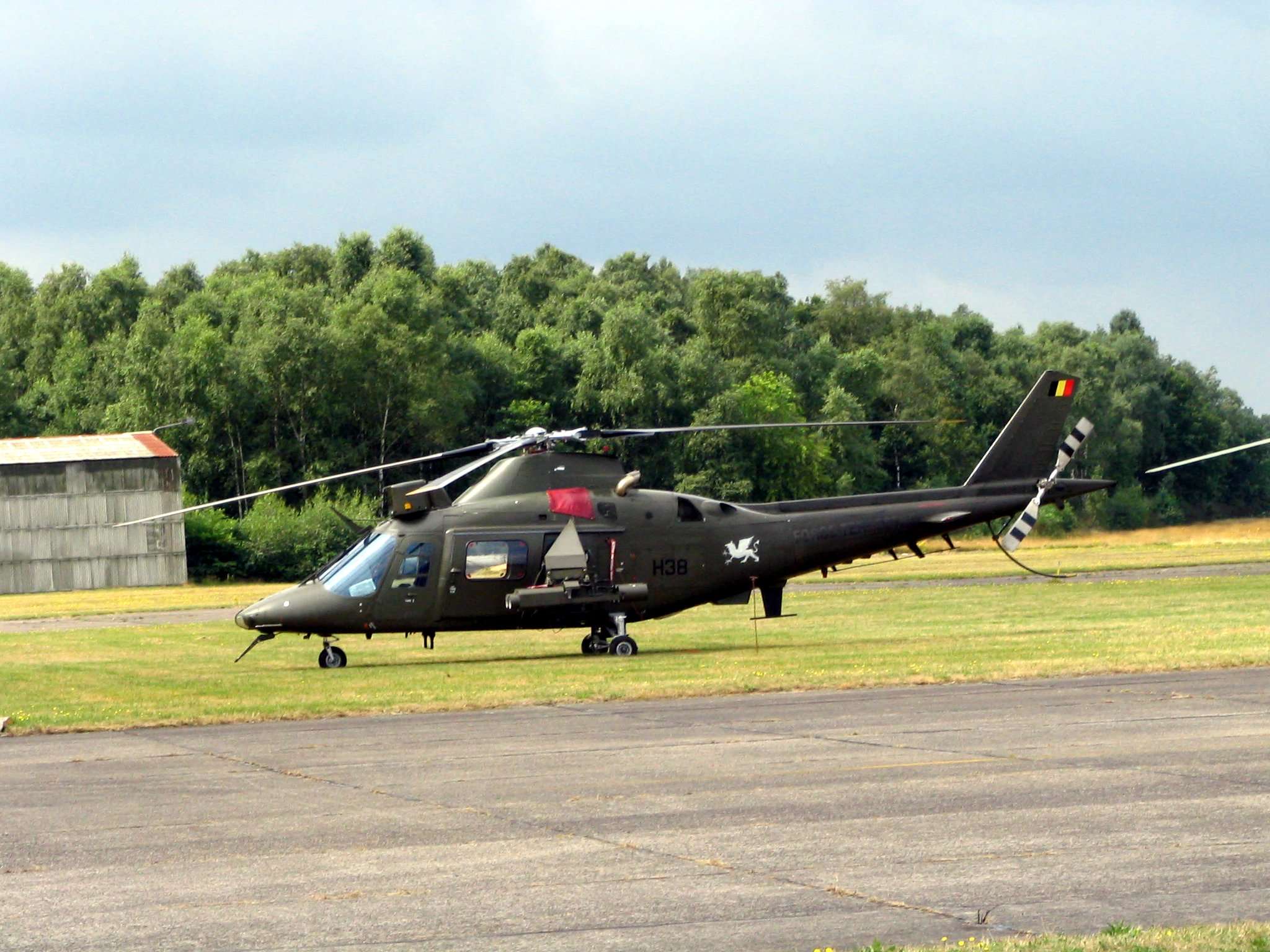
Belgian Air Force A109BA anti-tank variant.

Albania

- Albanian Air Force

Algeria

- Gendarmerie Nationale
- Algerian police

Angola

- National Air Force of Angola

Bangladesh

- Bangladesh Navy

Belgium

- Belgian Air Force Procurement tainted with a bribes scandal

Bulgaria

- Bulgarian Border Police

Cambodia

- Royal Cambodian Air Force

Cameroon

- Cameroon Air Force

Chile

- Carabineros de Chile

Egypt

- Egyptian Air Force

Greece

- Hellenic Air Force

India

- Government of Uttar Pradesh: One AW109S Grand delivered in 2010.

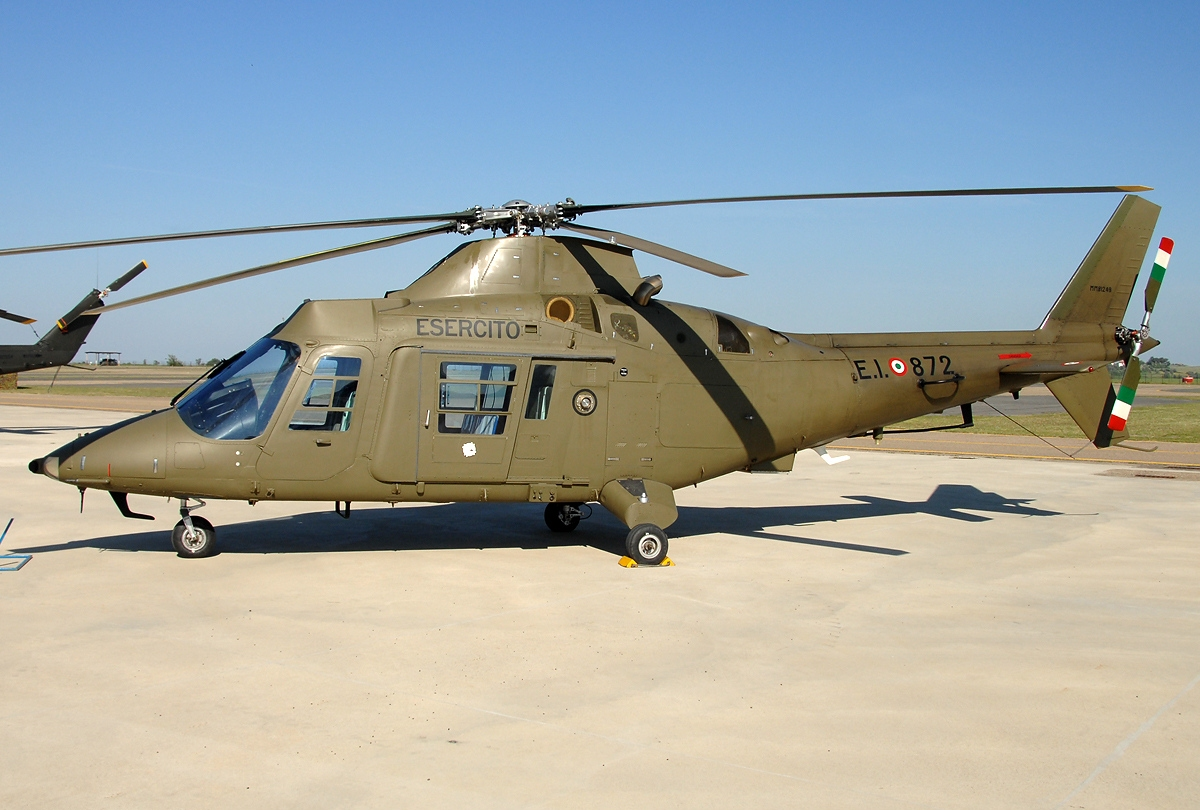
Italian Army A109CM

Italy

- Polizia di Stato
- Carabinieri
- Guardia di Finanza
- Italian Army, retired 14 October 2021
- Vigili del Fuoco
- State Forestry Corps

Japan

- Tokyo Metropolitan Police

Latvia

- State Border Guard

Malaysia

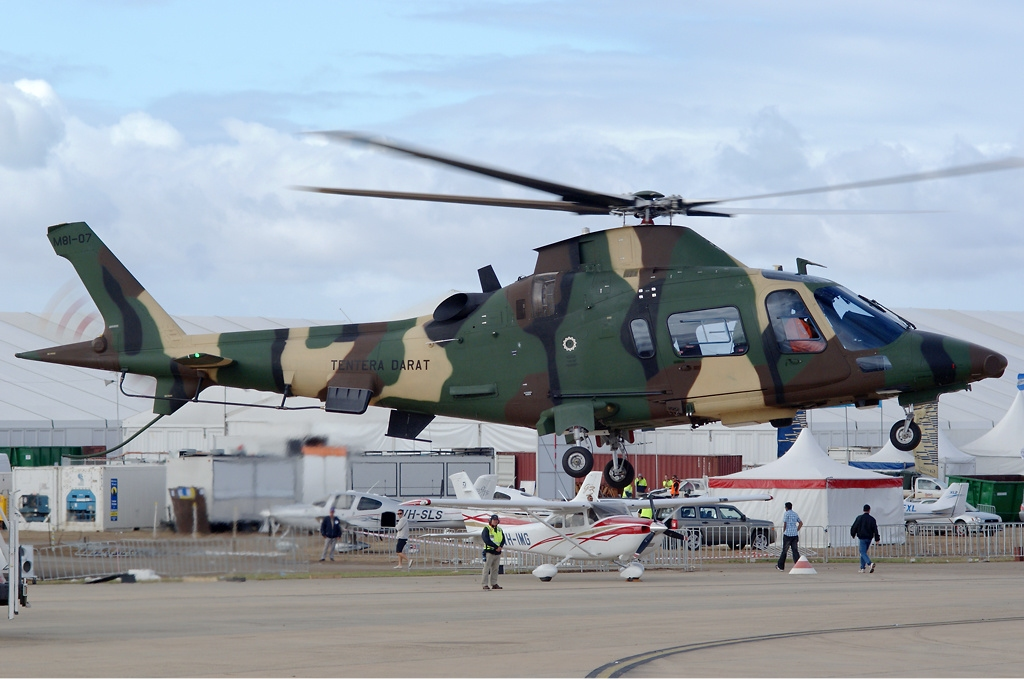
Malaysian Army A-109E LUH Vabre

- Malaysian Army

Mexico

- Mexican Air Force

New Zealand

- Royal New Zealand Air Force

Nigeria

- Nigerian Air Force
- Nigerian Navy

Peru

- Peruvian Army

Philippines

- Philippine Air Force
- Philippine Navy

Slovenia

- Slovenian Air Force
- Slovenian Ministry of Defence
- Slovenian Police

South Africa

- South African Air Force
- Transnet National Ports Authority

Sweden

- Swedish Armed Forces

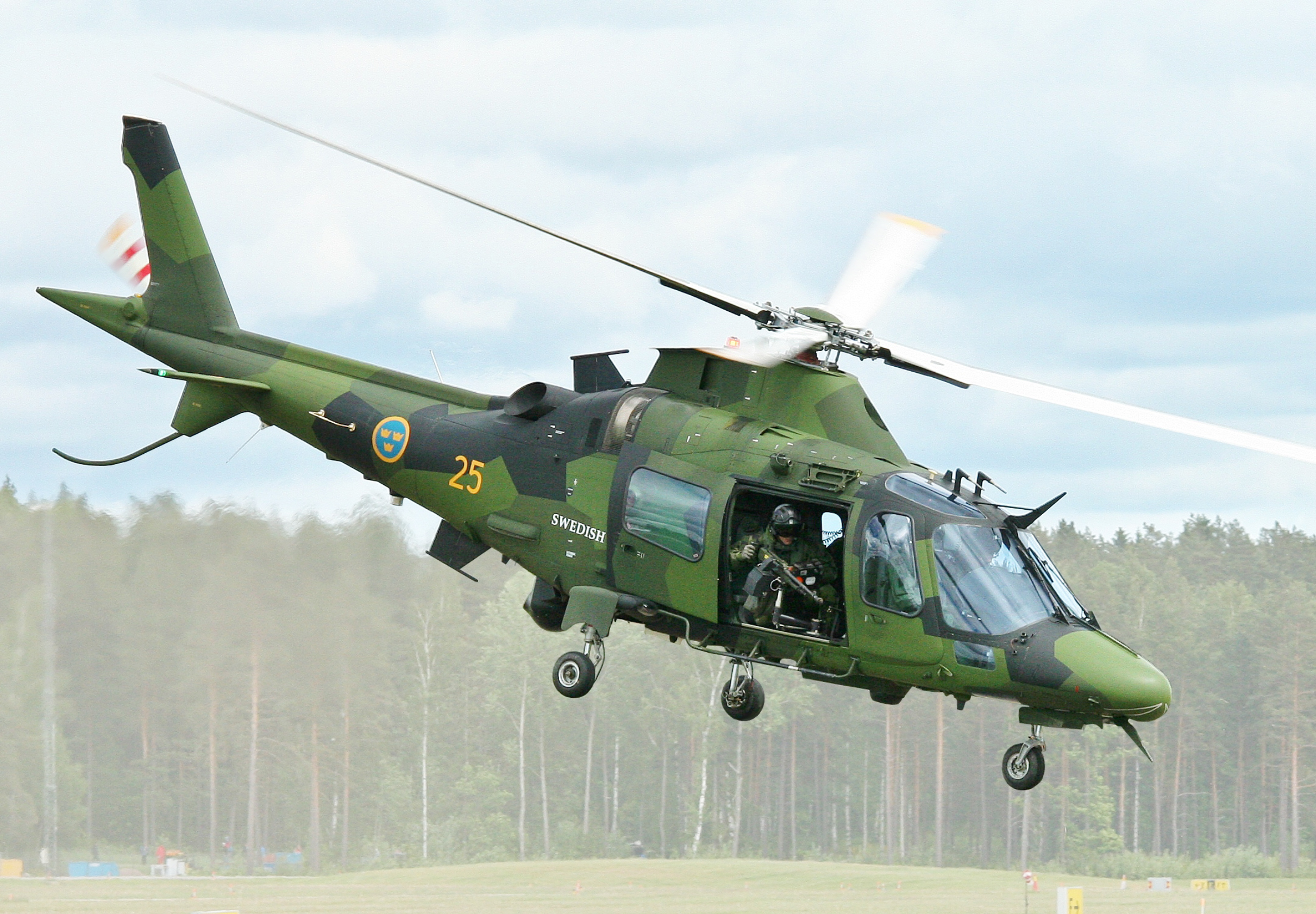
A Swedish Armed Forces A109 LUH, designated Hkp-15A

Turkmenistan

- Turkmen Air Force

Uganda

- Uganda National Police

United States

- Phoenix, AZ Police Department

=== Former military and government operators ===
Argentina

- Argentine Army operated 9 aircraft (1979–2007)

Australia

- Royal Australian Navy operated 3 aircraft (2007–2012)

Italy

- Italian Air Force operated 3 aircraft

Paraguay

- Paraguayan Air Force

Poland

- Air ambulances in Poland

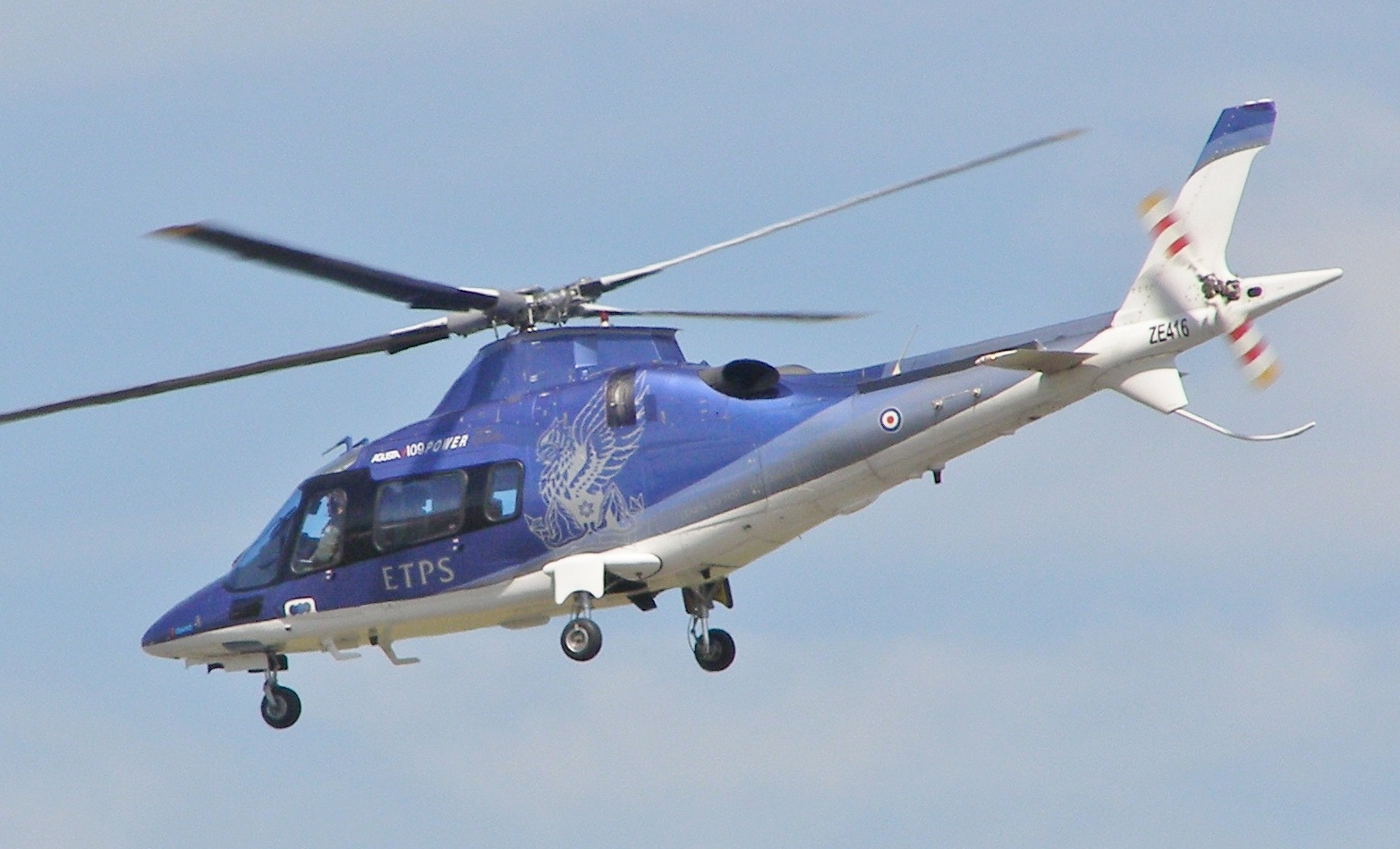
A109E of the Empire Test Pilots' School

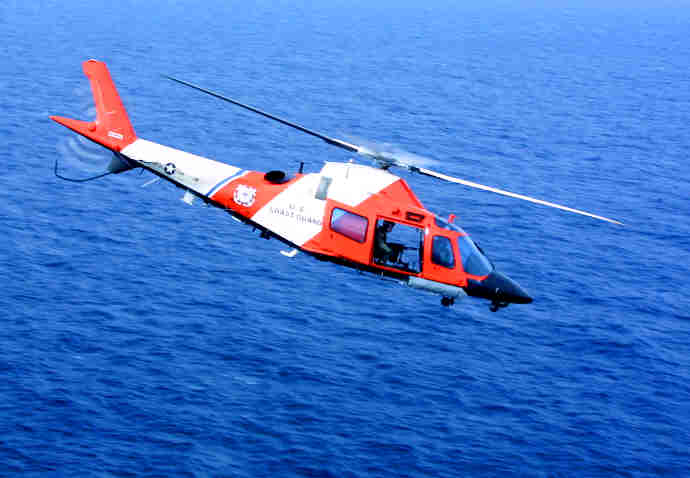
A U.S. Coast Guard MH-68A Stingray

United Kingdom

- Army Air Corps
- Royal Air Force

United States

- United States Coast Guard

Venezuela

- Venezuelan Army

== Accidents ==
- On 26 July 1999: An Agusta A109E Power (Registration EC-GQX) crashed in Villarejo de Salvanés, Madrid, Spain, resulting in a fatality. The helicopter experienced an in-flight emergency shortly after takeoff. Thorough forensic analysis of this incident, combined with later similar crashes, revealed a failure in the main rotor's rotating scissors mechanism. The July 1999 Spanish accident is particularly notable within aviation history because European investigators struggled to identify a cause initially. It took two subsequent crashes of similar Agusta A109E helicopters to uncover the root cause.
- On 27 March 1999: An older Agusta A109A Hirundo (Registration G-USTA) suffered a major failure in the UK after a tail rotor blade cracked, though no fatalities were reported.
- On 14 January 2000, at dusk, an Agusta A109E (registration G-JRSL) rolled out of control and crashed into Wheelgate Farm on Romney Marsh, Kent. The accident was triggered by a sudden engine power loss followed by a rapid, uncontrollable descent when visual reference was lost.
- On 17 June 2000 accident involving an Agusta A109E Power air ambulance (registration G-TVAA). At about 300 feet, a bang from the gearbox occurred, followed by an immediate near-loss of control. The pilot performed a forced autorotation into a field near Arborfield Cross, Berkshire, resulting in substantial damage to the aircraft but only minor injuries. The bang and loss of control resulted from the fracture of the lower swash plate scissors link. Investigators from the Air Accidents Investigation Branch determined that the link had been incorrectly reassembled by maintenance personnel just 3 hours and 10 minutes (or one day) before the flight. This failure severed the link between the rotating controls and the main rotor blades.
- On 27 July 2001, an AgustaWestland AW109 helicopter carrying Brazilian fashion model Fernanda Vogel ditches in the Atlantic Ocean near Maresias, Brazil. The pilot and Vogel's boyfriend swam to shore, but Vogel and the copilot drowned.
- On 31 October 2002, French baker and entrepreneur Lionel Poilâne, his wife, and their dog are killed when the Agusta AW109 helicopter he is piloting crashes in the Bay of Cancale off the coast of Brittany, France, while flying in fog.
- On 20 November 2009, an AW109E Power of Air ambulances in Poland crashed during landing.
- On 23 October 2010: An A109A crashed in the Leitrim Lodge picnic area of the Mourne Mountains leading to three casualties.
- On 16 January 2013: Vauxhall helicopter crash, an AW109 on a charter, clipped a construction crane attached to the St George Wharf Tower in Vauxhall, London, before crashing to the ground and bursting into flames, killing the pilot and a person on the ground. The helicopter was completely destroyed and the crane was also seriously damaged.
- On 24 December 2018: in the 2018 Puebla helicopter crash, an AW109 taking off from an airport on the outskirts of Puebla on a flight to Mexico City crashed about 3.5 miles north of the airport. Governor Martha Érika Alonso and former Governor Rafael Moreno Valle Rosas died in this incident.
- On 14 January 2021, an AW109 of the State Border Service of Turkmenistan crashed near Ýaşlyk in Ahal Region, Turkmenistan. The vehicle reportedly collided with a transmission tower because of bad weather conditions, killing three border guards, including an officer.
- On 26 September 2021, a Philippine Navy AW109E Power serial NH435 crashed at Cagayan North International Airport at Lal-lo, Cagayan. No Casualties.
- On 5 December 2024, A Philippine Navy AW109E Power serial NH432 crashed on the runway of Danilo Atienza Air Base in Cavite City. No Casualties.

== Displayed ==
- A109A from Corpo Forestale, on display inside Rome's zoo.
- A109A at Fleet Air Arm Museum, Yeovil, England. Former AE-331 of the Argentine Army Aviation, captured in the Falklands War.
- A109A at South Yorkshire Aircraft Museum, Doncaster. The aircraft (ZE413) was flown by 8Flt AAC to provide a dedicated transport air wing to 22 SAS.
- A109A (Registration AE-336) at the Historic Argentine Military Museum in Buenos Aires, Argentina.

== Specifications (AW109 Power with PW206C) 2850 Kilo version ==
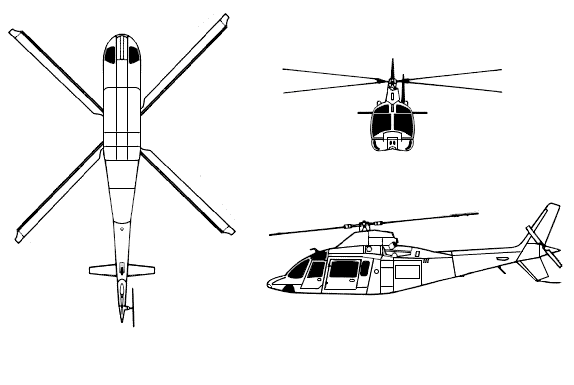

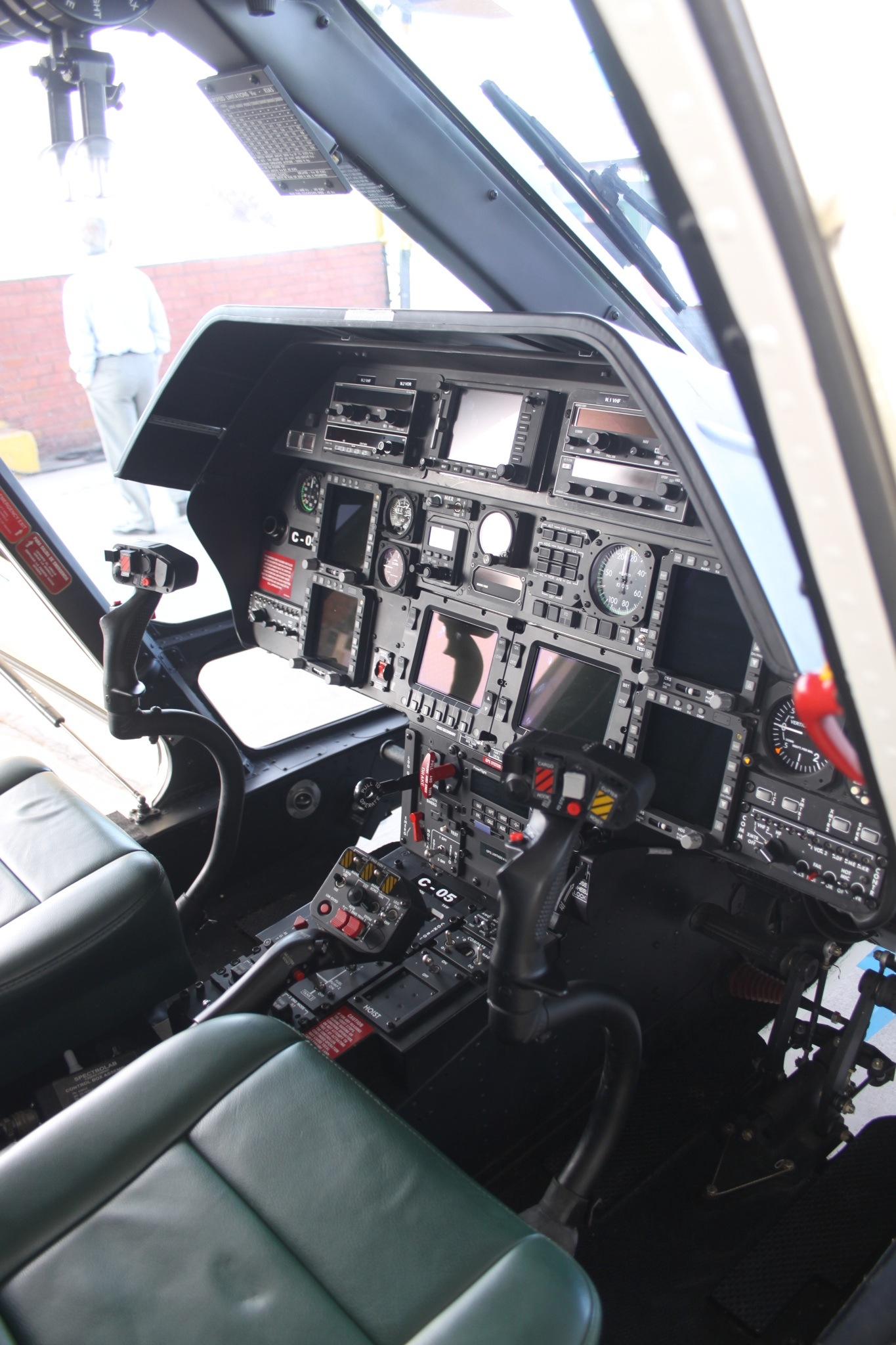
Flight deck of an AW109, 2012

Data from ‘’Leonardo’’"AW109 Power". Leonardo.

General characteristics

- Crew: 1 or 2
- Capacity: 6 or 7 passengers
- Length: 11.448 m (37 ft 7 in) fuselage
- Height: 3.50 m (11 ft 6 in)
- Empty weight: 1,590 kg (3,505 lb)
- Max takeoff weight: 2,850 kg (6,283 lb)
- Powerplant: 2 × Pratt & Whitney Canada PW206C Turboshaft engine, 418 kW (560 hp) each
- Main rotor diameter: 11.00 m (36 ft 1 in)

Performance

- Maximum speed: 311 km/h (193 mph, 168 kn)
- Cruise speed: 285 km/h (177 mph, 154 kn)
- Never exceed speed: 311 km/h (193 mph, 168 kn)
- Ferry range: 932 km (579 mi, 503 nmi)
- Rate of climb: 9.8 m/s (1,930 ft/min)

== See also ==
Related development

- AgustaWestland AW109S Grand
- Agusta A129 Mangusta
- AgustaWestland AW119 Koala

Aircraft of comparable role, configuration, and era

- Bell 222/230
- Bell 427
- Bell 429 GlobalRanger
- Bell 430
- Eurocopter AS365 Dauphin
- Eurocopter EC135
- MD Helicopters MD Explorer
- Sikorsky S-76
- HAL Dhruv
- HAL Light Utility Helicopter

Related lists

- List of rotorcraft
