= Pratt & Whitney Canada PW200 =

Family of turboshaft engines by Pratt & Whitney Canada

PW200
- Type: Turboshaft
- National origin: Canada
- Manufacturer: Pratt & Whitney Canada
- Major applications: AgustaWestland AW109; Bell 429; Eurocopter EC135; MD Explorer; Sikorsky S-76D
- Number built: >5,400

The Pratt & Whitney Canada PW200 is a family of turboshaft engines developed specifically for helicopter applications. It entered service in the 1990s.

== Variants ==
PW205B
First run 1987. Flown in twin-engine MBB BO105 for demonstration only.
PW206A
Maximum continuous power 550 shp (410 kW) for use on the MD Explorer
PW206B
Maximum continuous power 431 shp (321 kW), for use on the Eurocopter EC135
PW206B2
Maximum continuous power 431 shp (321 kW).
PW206C
Maximum continuous power 561 shp (418 kW), for use on the Agusta A109 Power
PW206E
Maximum continuous power 572 shp (427 kW). for use on the MD Explorer
PW207C
Maximum continuous power 572 shp (427 kW).
PW207D
Maximum continuous power 572 shp (427 kW).
PW207D1
Variant of the PW207 with increased mechanical power, maximum continuous power 610 shp (450 kW).
PW207D2
Variant of the PW207D1 with a fuel heater installed, maximum continuous power 610 shp (450 kW).
PW207E
Maximum continuous power 572 shp (427 kW). for use on the MD 902
PW207K
Maximum continuous power 630 shp (470 kW). for use on the Kazan Ansat
PW209T
Maximum continuous power 800 shp (600 kW). "Twin-pack" First run 1985, cancelled 1987. Intended for Bell TwinRanger
PW210
Enhanced version of the PW200. Enhancements include; Lower fuel consumption, Dual Channel Full Authority Digital Engine Control (FADEC), Reduced environmental emissions and an Increase in power output ranging from 800 shp (600 kW) to 1,100 shp (820 kW).

== Applications ==
- AgustaWestland AW109
- AgustaWestland AW169
- Airbus Helicopters H160 (prototype only)
- Bell 360 Invictus (planned)
- Bell 429 GlobalRanger
- Boeing A160 Hummingbird
- Eurocopter EC135
- Kazan Ansat
- MD Helicopters MD Explorer
- Sikorsky S-76D

== Specifications ==
Data from

==== General characteristics ====
- Type: Turboshaft
- Length: 35.9 in (91.2 cm)
- Diameter: 19.7 in (50 cm)
- Dry weight: 237 lb (107.5 kg)

==== Components ====
- Compressor: Single-stage centrifugal. PW210: Two-stage mixed flow and centrifugal
- Combustors: Annular
- Turbine: Single-stage high pressure turbine, single-stage power turbine. PW210: Two-stage power turbine

==== Performance ====
- Maximum power output: 561 shp (418 kW)
- Specific fuel consumption: 0.542 lb/hp-hr
- Power-to-weight ratio: 2.4 hp/lb (3.9 kW/kg)
