= European Air Ambulance =

- Abbreviation: EAA
- Formation: 2006
- Headquarters: Luxembourg Airport
- Region served: Worldwide
- Parent organization: Luxembourg Air Rescue
- Website: EAA

The European Air Ambulance (EAA) is an air ambulance service provider, offering medical repatriation services for hospitals, insurance and assistance companies, embassies, administrative bodies, NGOs, corporations and individuals across the world. In 2016 and in 2024, it was named ITIJ Air Ambulance Provider of the Year.

Part of the Luxembourg Air Rescue (LAR), EAA is the first air ambulance to have an infectious disease module. As of 2016, it is the only air ambulance in the world to have certified weight transportation stretchers.

== History and operations ==
EAA was founded in 2006 as a partnership between Luxembourg Air Ambulance (LAA) and de:DRF Luftrettung. After DRF's departure in 2014, LAA became the sole operator of EAA. EAA completed 792 missions in 117 countries in the year 2015. Since 2016, the EAA has been co-ordinating its operations from its mission control centre based at the Luxembourg Airport.

EAA has a fleet of three Learjet 45XR aircraft and a team of 150 full-time staff and 40 freelance physicians.

In 2015, EAA launched EASA-approved IsoPod infectious disease module which enabled the transport of patients with highly infectious diseases, with minimal risk to medical staff and crew. EAA developed a new stretcher system and adapted its aircraft specifically to deal with overweight patients for up to 170 kg (~374 pounds). In 2017, EAA began using an intelligent interface it had developed, called the Bluebox, to deliver power in-transit to neonatal incubators and all connected appliances.

== Partnerships ==
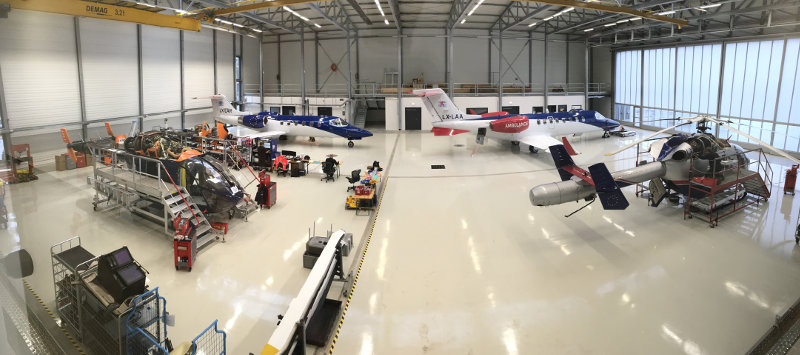
LAR and EAA hangar

Through its parent organization LAR, the EAA is an official partner of the United Nations and NATO. It also works in close alliance with the Luxembourg government and the European Union in order to provide medical support in the event of a humanitarian disaster. EAA has also been a part of the International Assistance Group since 2008.

EAA has signed agreements with emergency medical care providers across the world such as Skyservice Air Ambulance (North America), Amref Health Africa (Africa), LifeFlight (Australia), AirLink (Americas), ER24 Global (South Africa) and RMSI (UAE).
