= René Closter =

- Closter in 2008
- Born: 15 December 1952; Wiltz, Luxembourg
- Known for: President and founder of Luxembourg Air Rescue

René Closter (born 15 December 1952) is a Luxembourgish businessman and retired firefighter who is the founder and chairman of the board of directors of Luxembourg Air Rescue (LAR) and Executive Board Member of Luxembourg Air Ambulance (LAA).

== Career ==
An electro-technician by trade, Closter started his working career in 1973 within the professional fire brigade of Luxembourg City. After resuming his education studying business management, he became a senior manager in the financial services sector with positions in London, Hong Kong and New York City.

Closter is inextricably linked to the development of air rescue operations in Luxembourg. He gave his father-in-law's house as collateral to start with LAR. On 1 July 1995, he was officially nominated as CEO of LAR, a position which he held until 1 May 2021.

Today, he is a member of ING's external advisory board and VP of DRF Luftrettung.

In 2015, Closter was awarded the prize of the Foundation of the Deutsche Bank Luxembourg S.A. for the support of the German-Luxembourgish cooperation in the area of the sciences.

He was appointed Officer in the Order of Civil and Military Merit of Adolph of Nassau by Grand Duke Henri in June 2021. In addition, he was awarded the title of "Officer in the Order of the Crown" by King Albert II of Belgium.

Closter has a son, Max Closter, from his first marriage with Emilie Kirtz.
