= Luxembourg Air Rescue =

Humanitarian air rescue organisation

Luxembourg Air Rescue A.s.b.l.
- Founded: April 18, 1988
- Location: Luxembourg
- Members: 183,000 (jan 2021)
- Website: http://www.lar.lu

Luxembourg Air Rescue (LAR) is a private, humanitarian air rescue organisation in Luxembourg, the Greater Region surrounding Luxembourg or worldwide through the operation of its helicopters and air ambulances.

== Activities ==
=== Luxembourg and Greater Region ===
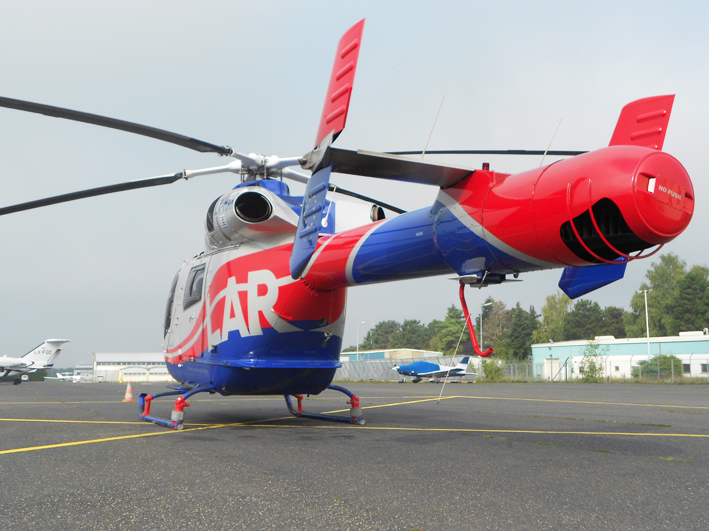
MD Helicopter 902

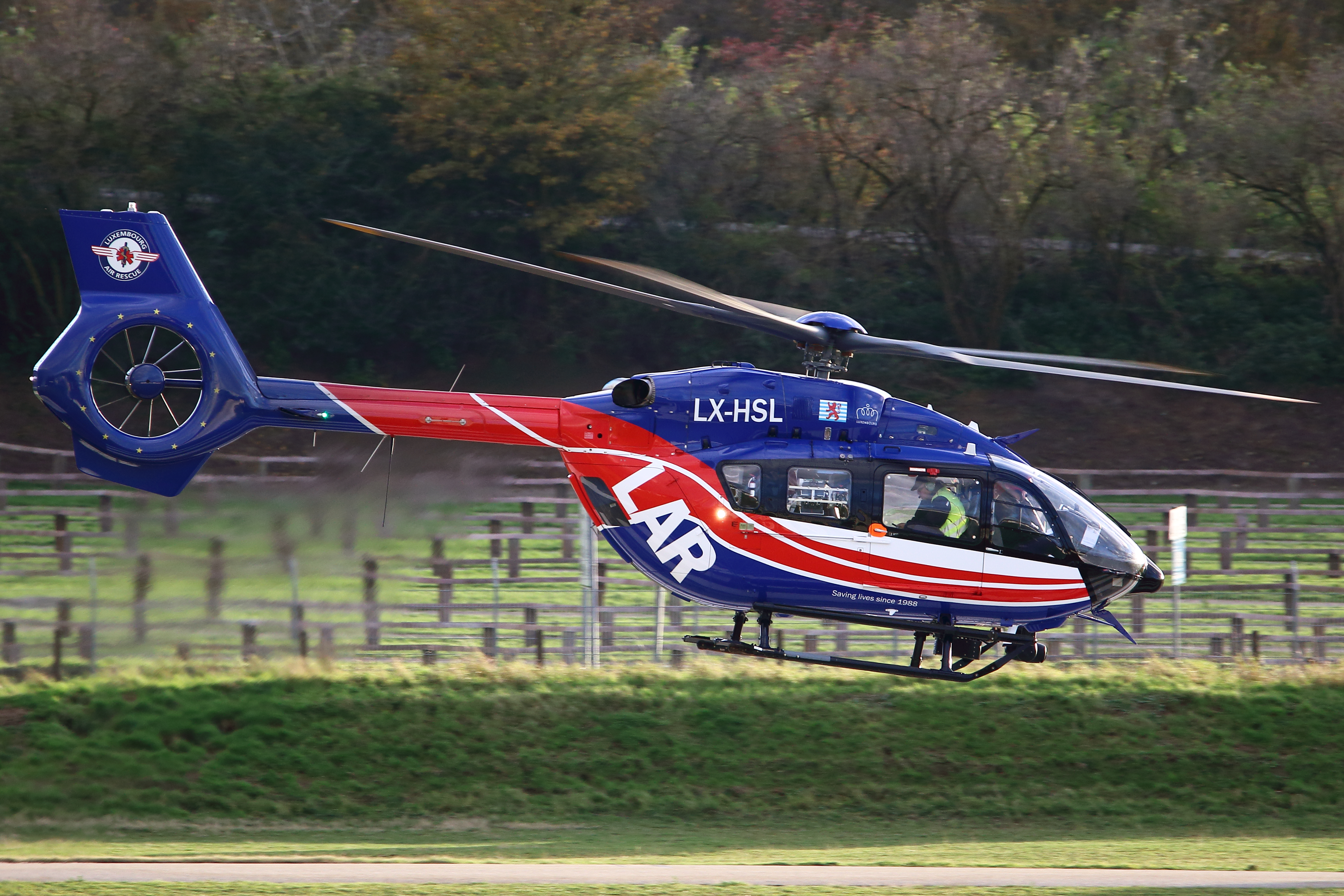
Airbus Helicopters H145

LAR operates a total of five MD Helicopters MD Explorer 902 and two Airbus Helicopters H145 rescue helicopters.

=== Worldwide ===
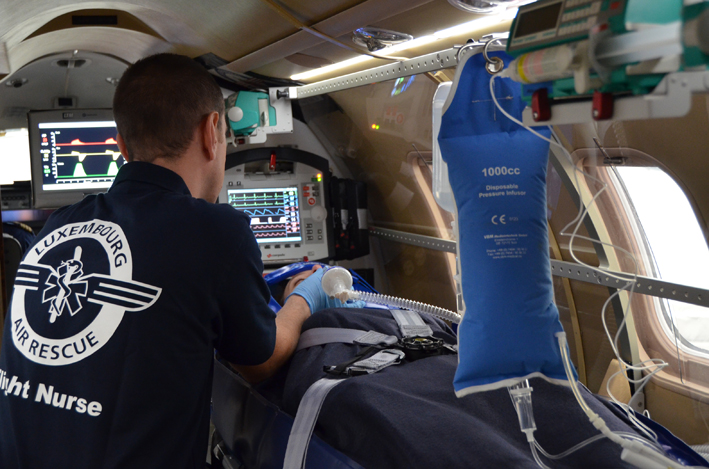
Repatriation by air ambulance

Findel airport is the base station for the ambulance aircraft of the Luxembourg Air Rescue. The aircraft are suitable for day and night operations for medium and long haul routes and are equipped for the transportation of intensive care patients between clinics as well as for the repatriation of ill and injured patients from abroad. Currently the fleet consists of three ambulance aircraft of the type LearJet 45XR and one Challenger 605. The international branch for the commercialisation of these worldwide medical repatriations is “European Air Ambulance”.

=== Organ transports ===
In 2007 LAR won a European tender for the exclusive transport of organs in France. Since then, LAR transports organs with its fixed wing fleet. These missions are mainly performed during the night.

=== Humanitarian missions ===
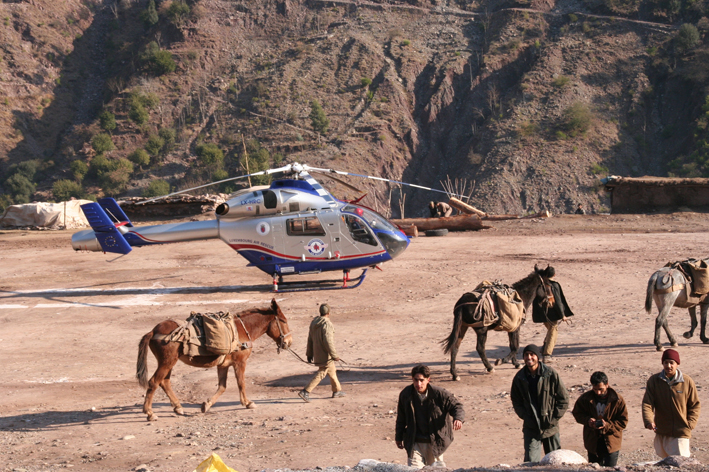
Humanitarian mission in Pakistan

Help in disaster relief operations in conjunction with the Luxembourg government, NATO and the United Nations. Partner of Emergency.lu:

Emergency.lu is an agreement of the Luxembourg Government with a Joint Undertaking (JU) between HITEC Luxembourg S.A. and SES Techcom Services (formally SES Astra TechCom S.A.) - in partnership with Luxembourg Air Ambulance S.A. It supplies rapid response for disaster relief and humanitarian missions. The agreement includes the installation and operation of a global satellite based communications system. Luxembourg Air Ambulance will, in case of activation, ensure a smooth processing at the Findel Airport in Luxembourg along with the provision of the necessary air transportation.

== Milestones of Luxembourg Air Rescue ==
18 April 1988
The official foundation of Luxembourg Air Rescue (LAR A.s.b.l.).

1 March 1989
LAR presents its first helicopter. On the same day, the Bell B 206 Long Ranger flies its first mission. Initially, LAR was only allowed to transport patients from hospital to hospital.

15 June 1989
Acknowledgment of the “Fondation Luxembourg Air Rescue” as a non-profit institution by Grand-Ducal decree.

9 July 1990
General vicar Mathias Schiltz is nominated President of the Fondation Luxembourg Air Rescue.

15 May 1991
Fleet change: The new two turbine BO 105 CBS replaces the one turbine Bell Long Ranger.

1 November 1991

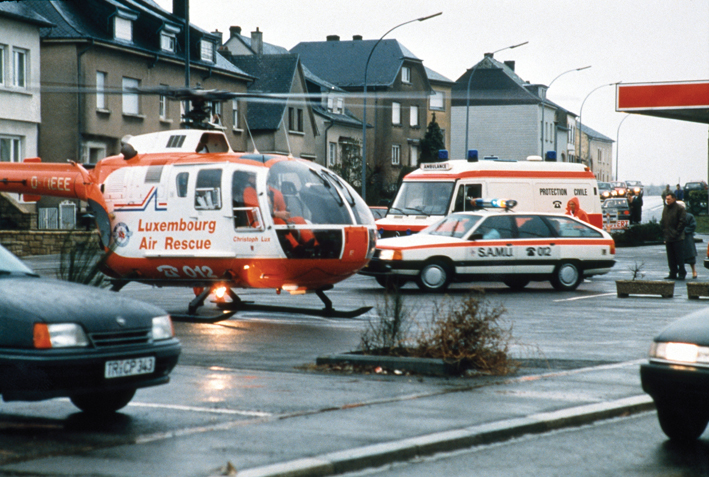
Integration into the Luxembourgish rescue services

Thanks to a convention with the Minister of Internal Affairs, LAR becomes a part of the Luxembourgish rescue service SAMU

April 1995
Hereditary Grand Duke Henri takes over the patronage of LAR.

April 1995
An additional helicopter of the type Ecureuil is added to the fleet. The Ecureuil is exclusively used for secondary transports (from hospital to hospital) and based at the Findel Airport.

May 1995
The LAR operations have successfully implemented the standards of the international flight regulations JAR OPS 3.

19 July 1996
An MD 900 Explorer helicopter replaces the Ecureuil. Thanks to its size, its inferior noise levels, and its NOTAR-System (the MD 900 Explorer has no rear rotor thus reducing the danger of accidents), this helicopter type is particularly suitable for rescue missions.

19 July 1996
Opening of a second air base in Ettelbrück, enabling the SAMU to reach every point in Luxembourg within 10 minutes.

September 1998
The first LAR-owned air ambulance, a Mitsubishi MU-2, is put into operation. From now on, member repatriation flights can be performed within Europe and North Africa.

March 1999
Fleet change: After 8 years of faithful services to LAR, the BO 105 is replaced by a second MD Explorer helicopter.

April 1999
In cooperation with Caritas Internationalis, LAR brings roughly a ton of urgently needed emergency medication to a refugee camp in Kosovo.

November 1999
Due to the numerous repatriations from far away countries, LAR puts the second air ambulance, type LearJet 35A (LX-ONE), into service.

March 2000
The LAR air ambulance fleet is modernised: The Mitsubishi MU 2 is replaced by a King Air B200 (LX-DUC).

1 January 2001
On behalf of the Luxembourgish Police, LAR puts an additional MD Explorer helicopter into operations. The expenses resulting from these missions are covered by the Police.

9 July 2002

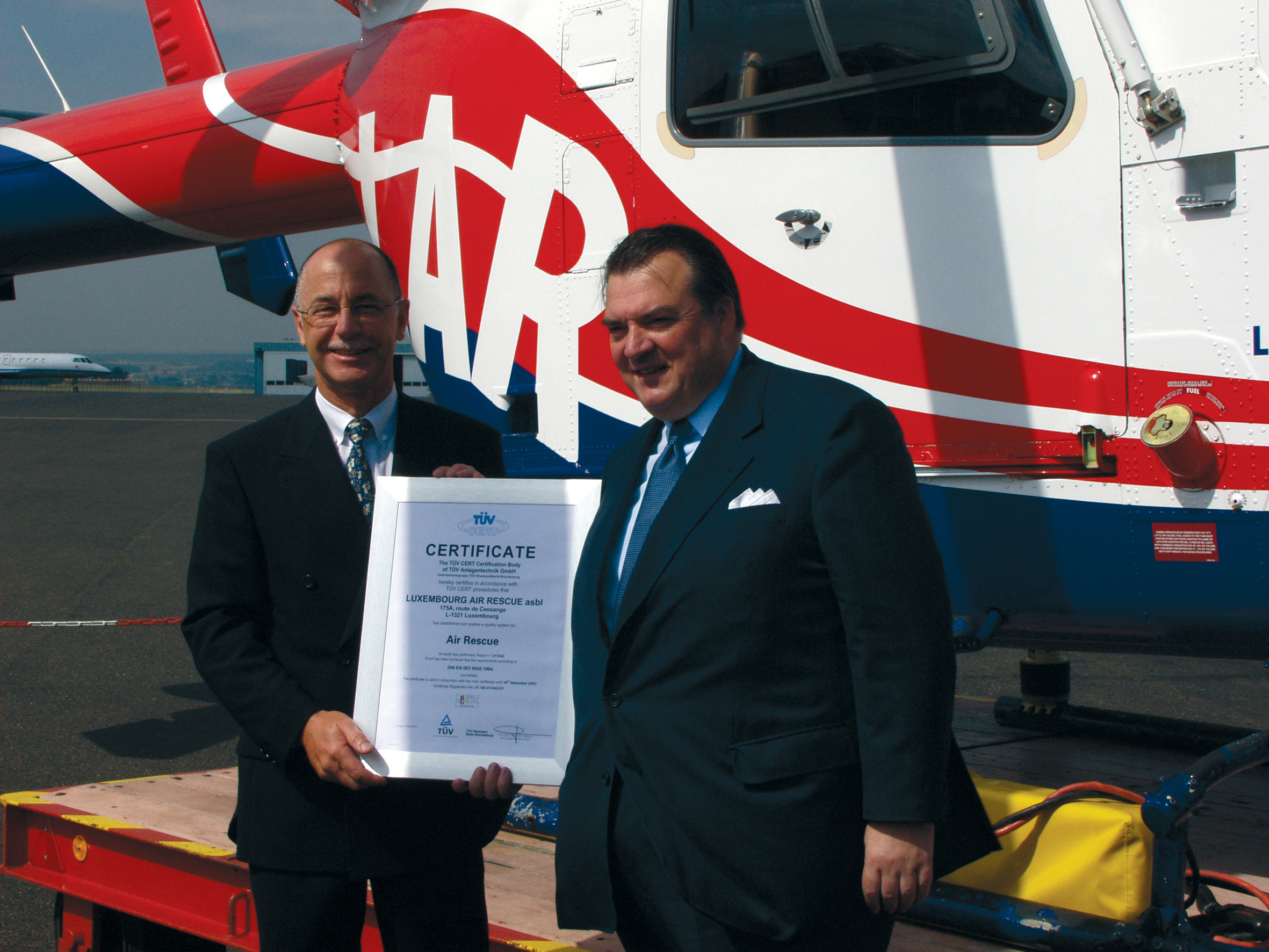
ISO-Certification

As first air rescue organisation worldwide, LAR receives the ISO 9001:2000-Certification in all domains.

October 2002
Fleet extension: In order to guarantee continuous air operations during maintenance intervals, a third MD Explorer helicopter is purchased as spare helicopter.

July 2003
The second air ambulance, type LearJet 35A (LX-LAR), is put into operation for worldwide repatriation flights. The LX-LAR replaces the King Air B200 (LX-DUC).

26 December 2003

Following an earthquake killing more than 80.000 people and by request of the Luxembourgish Foreign Ministry / "Direction de la Coopération au Développement", LAR transfers both of its air ambulance jets to Bam, Iran. In collaboration with the canine rescue unit of the Luxembourgish Red Cross, LAR provides instantaneous disaster relief. From now on, humanitarian commitments are part of the mission spectrum of LAR. Two further humanitarian missions followed within one year.

An LAR air ambulance provides humanitarian relief efforts following an earthquake in Morocco.

27 May 2004

The ground-breaking ceremony for the construction of the LAR hangar in Ettelbrück is held.

January 2005

An LAR medical team provides help by means of the LearJet into the tsunami affected areas.

March 2005

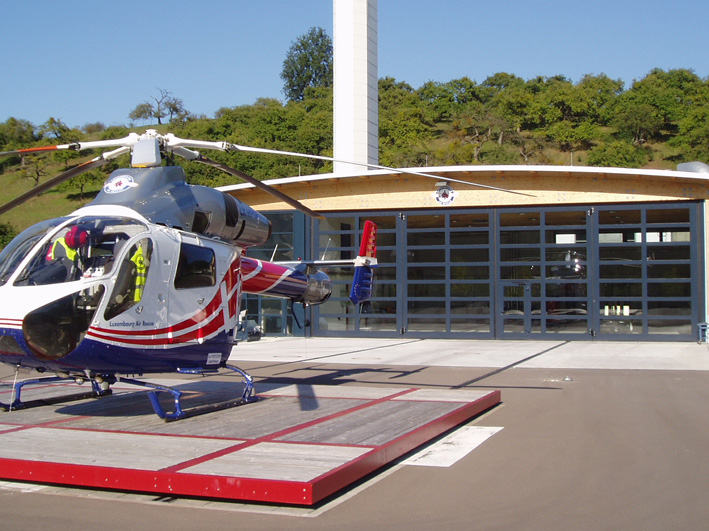
Inauguration of the new helicopter hangar in Ettelbrück

The helicopter hangar of LAR in Ettelbrück is inaugurated. From now on, the helicopter „Air Rescue 2“ is stationed there, thus increasing the operational readiness in the Oesling, while saving expenses for the daily flights from and to the LAR basis at Findel as well as reducing the noise levels for local residents by approximately 40%.

March 2005
Cross border help - extension of the fleet by a fourth helicopter: An emergency knows no borders: By contract with the Ministers of Internal Affairs of Rhineland-Palatinate and Saarland, LAR is integrated into the rescue system of both German Federal States. From now on, an additional LAR helicopter positioned at the Findel Airport and operates daily rescue missions in the nearby German border area. The costs of these interventions are covered by the German health insurance schemes.

October 2005

During a three months long commitment following an earthquake in the Pakistani Kashmir area, LAR executes 925 helicopter missions transporting 2.112 patients and 20 tons of aid supplies. This mission is the longest humanitarian disaster relief mission in the history of LAR.

July 2006
Extension of the LAR fleet with a Double-Stretcher LearJet 35A (LX-TWO), enabling the simultaneous transportation of two intensive care patients.

November 2006
LAR provides a rescue helicopter for the NATO summit in Riga. The expenses of this mission are covered by the Luxembourgish Government.

October 2007
Following a successful bid on a European tender, the Hôpitaux Universitaires de Strasbourg (HUS) appoint LAR as their exclusive organ transportation provider for the whole of France.

July 2008
In cooperation with France Transplant, LAR expands its organ transportation activities throughout the north-eastern region of France.

April 2009
An additional hangar on P5 at the Findel airport has been remitted by the Ministry of Transportation. This interim solution enables LAR to shelter its aircraft and technical equipment.

29 April 2009
The LAR fleet is expanded to include a Cessna Citation Mustang, an aircraft to be primarily used for the organ team transportation activities. The Mustang Citation has the advantage of only needing a very short landing runway, thus allowing it to fly into regional airports as well as smaller airfields.

December 2009
A European regulation elaborated by EASA has stipulated that all helicopters in service for air rescue purposes need to be upgraded by the end of 2009 to fulfil the highest performance class possible in aviation. After two years of considerable financial investments, all five LAR rescue helicopters are equipped with the needed performance driven engines as well as separated tanks as required by these European directives.

5 March 2010
The first mission of LAR’s fifth helicopter. The MD902 helicopter with the registration number LX-HAR is the newest addition to the LAR fleet.

March/April 2010
LAR sends an MD902 helicopter to Austria as part of a 6-week training program. The LAR pilots will provide on-site training on the MD 902 helicopter for the helicopter pilots from the air rescue organisation Heli Austria.

18 July 2010
LAR, in cooperation with the Luxembourg Ministry of Home Affairs, is expanding its application area by including the Bambi Bucket®, an external water container used in fire-fighting.

February 2011
After a long preparation phase, Skyservice Air Ambulance and European Air Ambulance EAA (a GEIE between LAR and DRF Luftrettung) organizes a special reception to officially announce their collaboration. The new service accelerates the repatriation of patients from both sides of the Atlantic Ocean. No time will be lost on compulsory crew rest times since the wing-to-wing transfer will take place at the end of the duty time of one crew and include the handover of the patient to a fresh crew from the partner organization.
Critical patient transfers will take place in secure environments at the relevant service’s home airfield - in Canada at the Skyservice Air Ambulance bases in Montreal or Goose Bay and in Europe at the EAA bases in Luxembourg or Baden/Karlsruhe. Such cooperation also exists with RMSI, who specializes in the patient evacuation in crisis regions. RMSI stabilizes the patient in that region and then flies him out to the next international and safe airport, where EAA takes over and continues the repatriation under optimal medical conditions.

1 May 2011

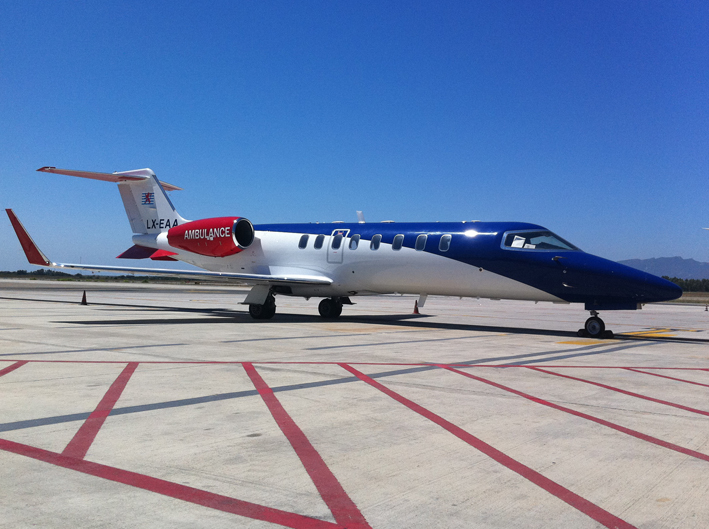
The new air ambulance LearJet 45XR

On May 1st, 2011, the first of two new aircraft lands at Findel airport. The LearJet 45XR is one of the most up-to-date jets of its category in terms of technology and can cover great distances while consuming only a minimum quantity of fuel. The LearJet 45XR also benefits from its short-landing capabilities as well as its speed.

17 November 2011
The two new ambulance aircraft are presented to the Luxembourgish public. The technical developments of the past 20 years made a restructuring of the fleet necessary in order to stay abreast of the changes in aviation and medical technology. With the new fleet, LAR journeys into a new era of air ambulance services.

5 June 2012
Due to the change and homogenization of the LAR fleet, the Cessna Citation Mustang leaves the fleet.

1 January 2013
Luxembourg Air Ambulance, a 100% subsidiary of the Luxembourg Air Rescue, becomes, together with a French partner, the exclusive organ team transporter for France Transplant in entire France except Paris. In line with the centralisation of the organ team transport, the Luxembourg Air Ambulance has jointly with its French partner won the public tender for the provision of a central operations centre as well as the operating of the organ team transports.

Since 1 January 2013, all organ team transports for all French transplantation centres (except those in Paris) are coordinated and executed via the LAR Luxembourg Control Center. Approximately 1.300 missions are operated jointly over the year.

12 June 2014
In the presence of Minister Bausch, René Closter, CEO and President of Luxembourg Air Rescue, lays the symbolic foundation stone of the new LAR operational building at the Luxembourg Airport. Ending the temporary housing in containers and tents, the new functional LAR building will contain 2 hangars. Following a 15 month long construction period, the building will house the state of the art control center, as well as a new maintenance hangar, thus creating an ideal work environment for LAR internal maintenance operations. As MDHI Service Center, LAR will subsequently be able to perform the entire maintenance of its rescue helicopter fleet in-house, thus eliminating the costly transfer to England for major maintenance works.

8 December 2014
Luxembourg Air Rescue’s recently purchased LearJet 45XR aircraft lands at the Findel Airport. This expansion of the fleet to a total of five air ambulances follows the continuing growth of LAR activities. Since the 22nd of January 2015, the new aircraft, with the registration LX-ONE, carries out patient repatriation flights after the aircraft has been coated in the LAR corporate colours and the authorisation procedures have been completed by the DAC (Direction de l’Aviation Civile).

July 2023

Addition of the first Airbus H145 (Registration LX-HSL, previously in service for DRF Luftrettung as D-HDSM) to the fleet.

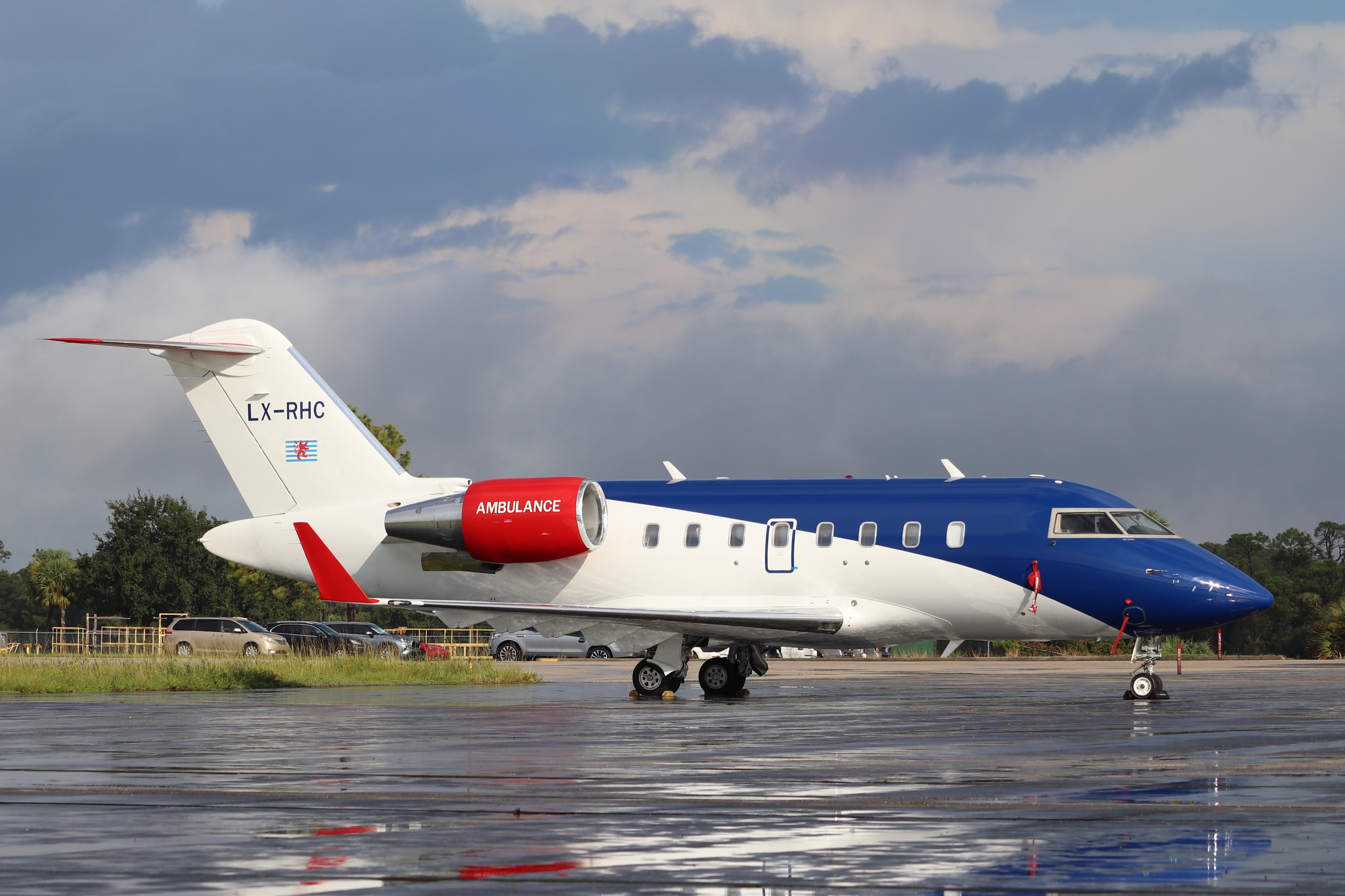

== See also ==
- René Closter
- MD Helicopters MD Explorer
- Eurocopter EC145
- Airline codes-L
