= Aero Asahi =

- Native name: 朝日航洋
- Founded: July 20, 1955
- Number of employees: 1,179 (April 1, 2014)
- Website: https://www.aeroasahi.co.jp/english/

朝日航洋株式会社 (Aero Asahi, asahikouyoukabushikigaisha) is a Japanese aviation company. It has a fleet of fixed wing aircraft and helicopters and provides a variety of aviation services. It is the largest helicopter operator in Japan.

== Doctor-Heli ==
The company's helicopters provide some Air medical services for Japan's "Doctor-Heli" Emergency Medical Services network. In 2015 it celebrated 10,000 medical missions performed by Aero Asahi MD 902 helicopters for Hokusho hospital in Chiba prefecture.

== Accidents and incidents ==
In August 1985 a Bell 412 operated by the company crashed in China with four fatalities.

In May 1989 a second Bell 412 operated by the company crashed in China with ten fatalities.

In August 1990 a Sikorsky S-76 operated by the company crashed in Hakone with the loss of two crew.

In September 1998 a Eurocopter AS350B3 operated by the company crashed in Nagano Prefecture with one fatality.

In 2004 a McDonnell Douglas MD 900 Explorer operated by the company made a crash-landing at Naval Air Facility Atsugi. There were no fatalities.

In September 2010 an Aérospatiale AS 332L Super Puma helicopter operated by the company crashed on Yakushima with the deaths of the two crew.

In September 2013 an Aero Asahi helicopter flew over a runway at Kansai International Airport in Osaka, causing an ANA airliner to abort a landing and come around again.

In March 2016 an Aero Asahi Aérospatiale AS 332L1 Super Puma helicopter dropped 800 kg of insulators in Fukui prefecture. There were no injuries.

In August 2016 a Kawasaki BK 117C-2 operated by the company crash-landed on the way to pick up a traffic accident victim for medical care. There were no injuries in the crash, but the victim of the traffic accident died.

== Helicopter fleet ==
- Bell 206B
- Eurocopter AS350B3
- Bell FB204B-II
- Eurocopter AS355F
- MD900
- MD902
- BK117C2
- Bell 430
- Bell 412
- Sikorsky S-76
- Eurocopter AS332L

== Fixed-wing fleet ==
- Cessna Citation Sovereign C680
- Cessna 208
