= MD Helicopters MD Explorer =

Light twin-engine utility helicopter

MD Explorer
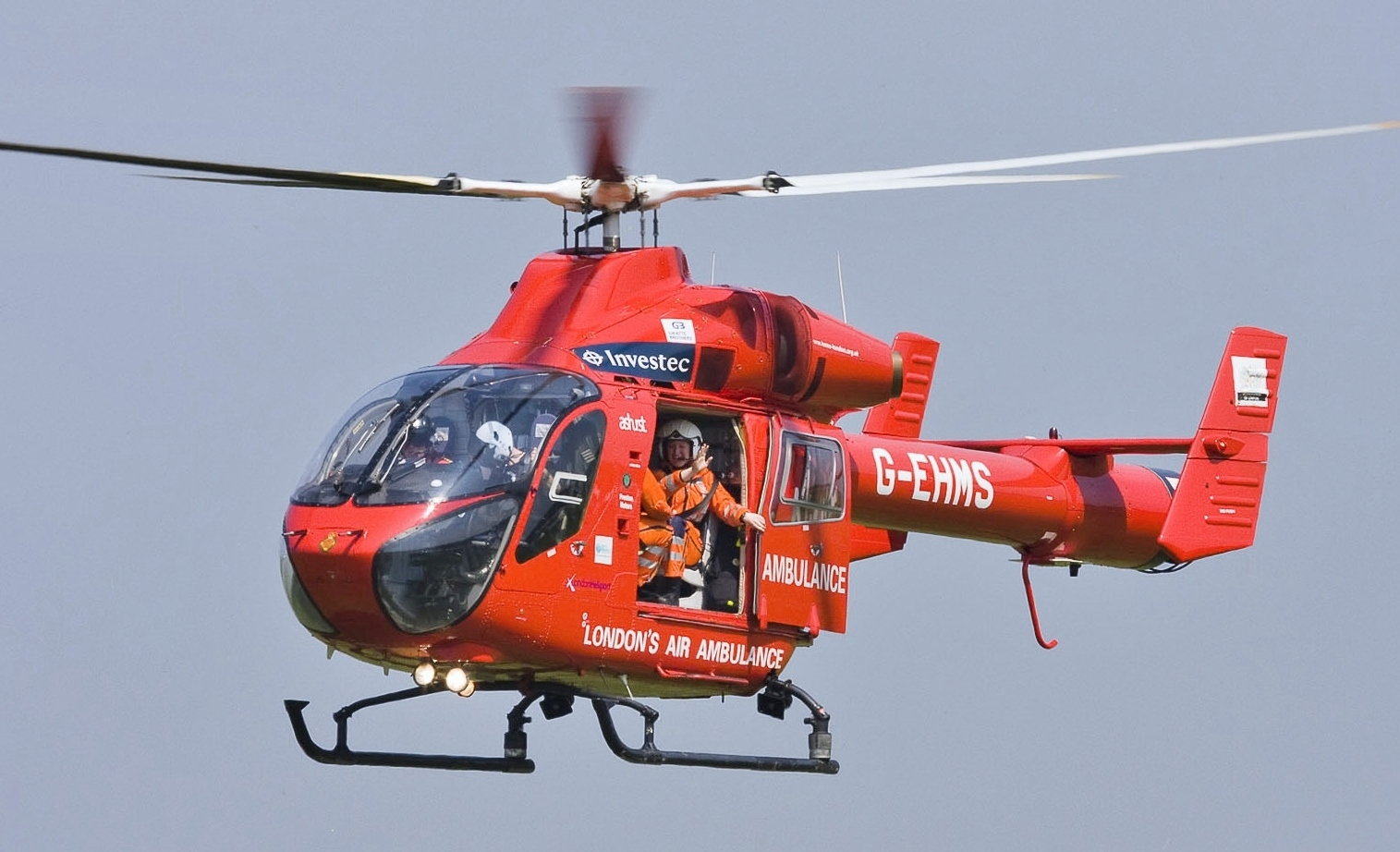
- One of London's Air Ambulance's two MD 902s in 2008.

General information
- Type: Light twin utility helicopter
- Manufacturer: McDonnell Douglas Helicopter Systems; MD Helicopters
- Status: In service
- Primary users: Mexican Navy Landespolizei; Luxembourg Air Rescue; Drug Enforcement Administration

History
- Manufactured: 1992–2019
- Introduction date: 1994
- First flight: 18 December 1992

The MD Helicopters MD Explorer is a light twin-engined utility helicopter designed and initially produced by the American rotorcraft specialist McDonnell Douglas Helicopter Systems. It was the company's first clean-sheet helicopter to incorporate the NOTAR system, which gave its tail a unique appearance as well as a quieter sound profile in contrast to a traditional tail rotor.

Development of the helicopter was launched in 1989 under the MDX designation; McDonnell Douglas partnered with Hawker de Havilland of Australia to produce the composite airframes, and was the launch customer for Pratt & Whitney Canada's PW200 turboshaft engine. On 18 December 1992, the Explorer's maiden flight took place; the Federal Aviation Administration (FAA) issued certification for the type roughly two years later.

Further development of the Explorer proceeded. During the late 1990s, the initial model, the MD 900, was joined by an improved successor, the MD 902. During the 2010s, a refresh of the Explorer led to the adoption of a glass cockpit and fully-digital avionics; a greater proportion of the manufacturing process was taken in-house around this time as well. The Explorer is currently produced by MD Helicopters.

== Development ==
In January 1989, McDonnell Douglas Helicopters officially announced the launch of the Explorer, which it initially referred to as the MDX. Amongst other things, the Explorer was the first McDonnell Douglas helicopter to incorporate the NOTAR system from its initial design. McDonnell Douglas partnered with Hawker de Havilland of Australia, which handled the manufacturing of the airframes. A total of ten prototypes were constructed, seven of which being used for ground-based tests. McDonnell Douglas Helicopters became a launch customer for Pratt & Whitney Canada's PW200 turboshaft engines, for which it had an exclusive agreement to power the first 128 Explorers with pairs of PW206As. While plans had been mooted to offer the Turbomeca Arrius powerplant as an alternative option, these were subsequently discarded.

On 18 December 1992, the maiden flight of the Explorer took place, performed by ship #2 (N900MD). On 2 December 1994, Federal Aviation Administration (FAA) certification for the Explorer was granted, permitting its use in North America; Joint Aviation Authorities (JAA) certification was received shortly thereafter. However, certification of the Explorer's instrument flight rules (IFR) capability was protracted due to technical difficulties with integration; in February 1997, FAA certification for IFR operations was finally received.

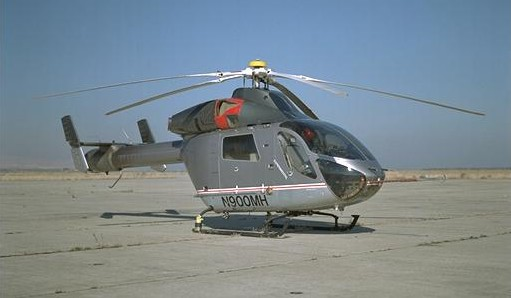
MD 900 (N900MH) Helicopter Noise Abatement Test, 1996

On 29 May 1997, all Explorers were temporarily grounded following the discovery of a broken drive-link; the following month, flight operations resumed after the FAA gave its approval of a redesigned component that addressed the issue.

During September 1997, a range of improvements to the Explorer were introduced. These included the availability of the PW206E engine, which had a higher single engine inoperative rating, along with revised engine air inlets, improved NOTAR inlet design, and a more powerful stabiliser control system. The benefits improved both range and endurance, along with an increased maximum takeoff weight. This enhanced Explorer was unofficially designated the MD 902.

In May 1998, it was reported that Bell Helicopters, as part of a wider deal with Boeing, had acquired the rights to support and produce components for the Explorer; however, this deal did not include the ability to perform final assembly or otherwise produce complete rotorcraft. Accordingly, it was speculated that the deal could impact the long-term future of the Explorer. However, these plans were terminated due to the intervention of the US Federal Trade Commission. Instead, in the following year, Boeing opted to spin off its civilian line of helicopters, including the Explorer, to the newly formed MD Helicopter Holdings Inc. (MDHI).

During November 1999, the JAA recommended that all 27 member nations certify the Explorer series for Category A single pilot IFR operations. In September 2000, the first Explorers had been delivered with the further improved PW207E engine, which provided improved hot and high performance, as well as when flown with only a single engine operational. During the 2000s, the company recovered from its financial woes and invested in the replenishment of its supply chain.

In the 2010s, the manufacturer dedicated considerable attention to renewing the avionics, with the addition of a glass cockpit. During 2013, it was announced that MDHI had selected Universal Avionics’ InSight display system for the MD 902 Explorer, replacing the original cathode ray tube (CRT) displays; four years later, the company started offering an alternative arrangement with Genesys Aerosystems. In January 2020, the company announced a new partnership with Universal Avionics, effectively switching back to the vendor, under which the latter would provide their fully-digital flight deck avionics for the MD 900/902 Explorer.

In October 2015, the Civil Aviation Authority of New Zealand (CAANZ) granted type acceptance to the MD 900/902 Explorer series, permitting restriction-free importing of the type into the country. That same year, the European Aviation Safety Agency (EASA) approved an increased maximum gross weight of 6,770 lb (3,070 kg) for the MD 900/902 Explorer, increasing its maximum payload capacity by 270 lb (120 kg) this increase had been approved by the FAA in March 2013.

Reportedly, by 2015, almost 50 percent of all MD 900/902 Explorers produced were being operated in Europe in three areas of the market: emergency medical services (EMS), law enforcement and military/para-military organizations. The EMS sector has been a deliberately selected focus area for MDHI; during 2011, the firm forecasted that Middle Eastern operators would require several hundred EMS rotorcraft over the coming years.

During March 2015, MDHI announced that it was in the process of redesigning the MD Explorer with a higher level of in-house content with the intention of making it more affordable and thus boost sales. The redesign/modernisation of the MD902 Explorer was subsequently referred to as the MD969.

By August 2022, while the MD Explorer series was still technically in production, some operators were facing difficulty obtaining crucial components and the supply chain was reportedly drying up. In response, some vendors were acquiring existing airframes and stripping them for their parts.

== Design ==
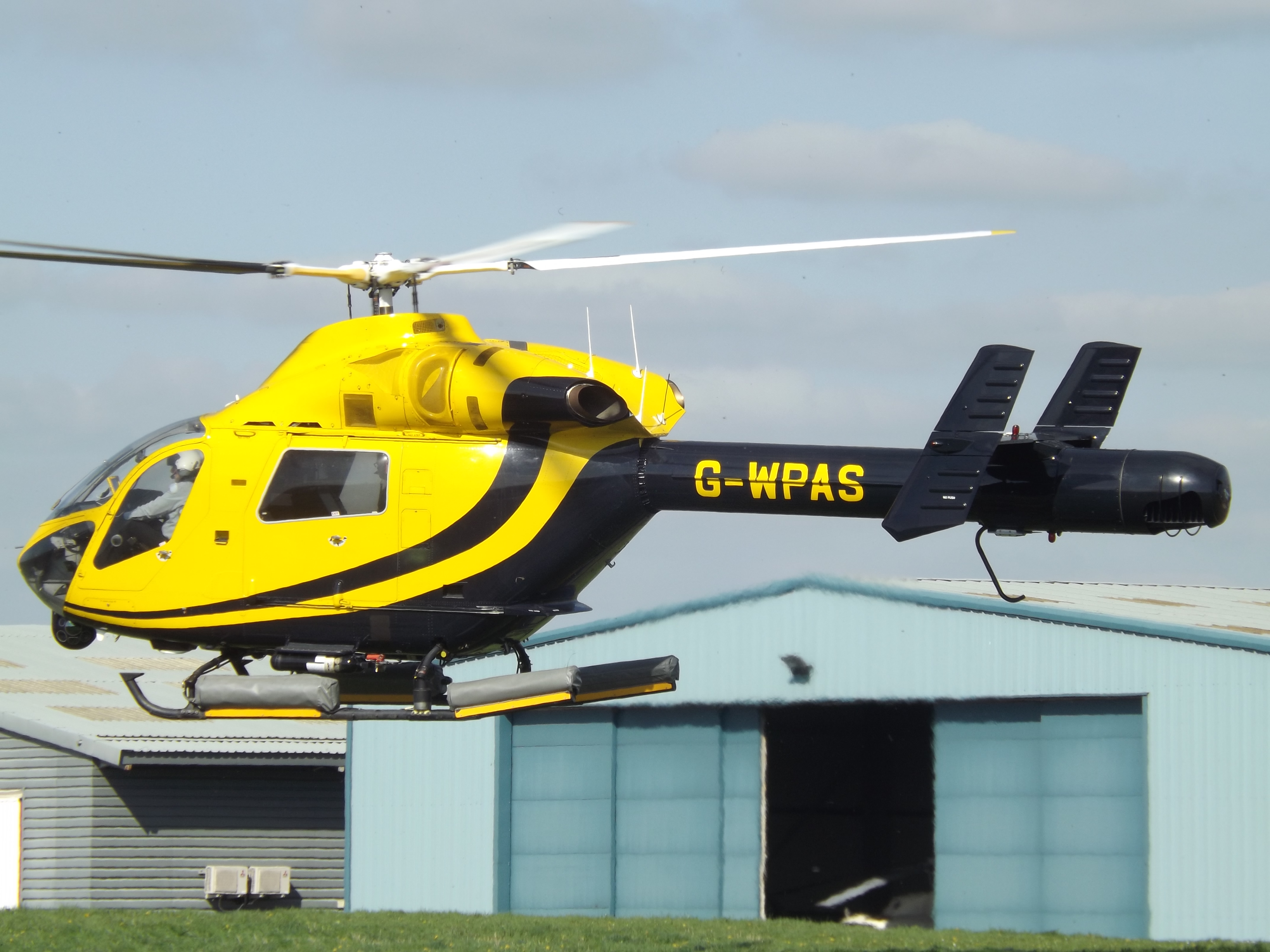
The design has a rotorless tail

The MD Helicopters MD Explorer is a twin engined utility helicopter; it is equipped with a fully-articulated five-bladed main rotor system as well as bearingless composite flexbeams and rotor hub. The fuselage is composed of composite materials, such as carbonfibre, that are resistant to corrosion even in hostile marine environments, it also incorporates lightning strike protection measures. The tail features similar construction. It is powered by a pair of Pratt & Whitney Canada-built PW200 turboshaft engines. It can be flown by a single pilot, and carry up to six passengers at a time.

A key feature of the MD Explorer is the NOTAR anti-torque system; instead of a traditional tail rotor, a fan exhaust is directed out of slots in the tail boom, thus using the Coandă effect for yaw control. The benefits of NOTAR have reportedly included reduced pilot workload, greatly minimised external noise levels, and significant improvements in safety, particularly when operating in confined areas and from offshore platforms, along with general performance and controllability enhancements. It is disputed which of the fenestron and NOTAR approaches produces less noises. Boeing retains the design rights to the NOTAR technology despite selling the former McDonnell Douglas civil helicopter line to MD Helicopters in early 1999.

== Variants ==
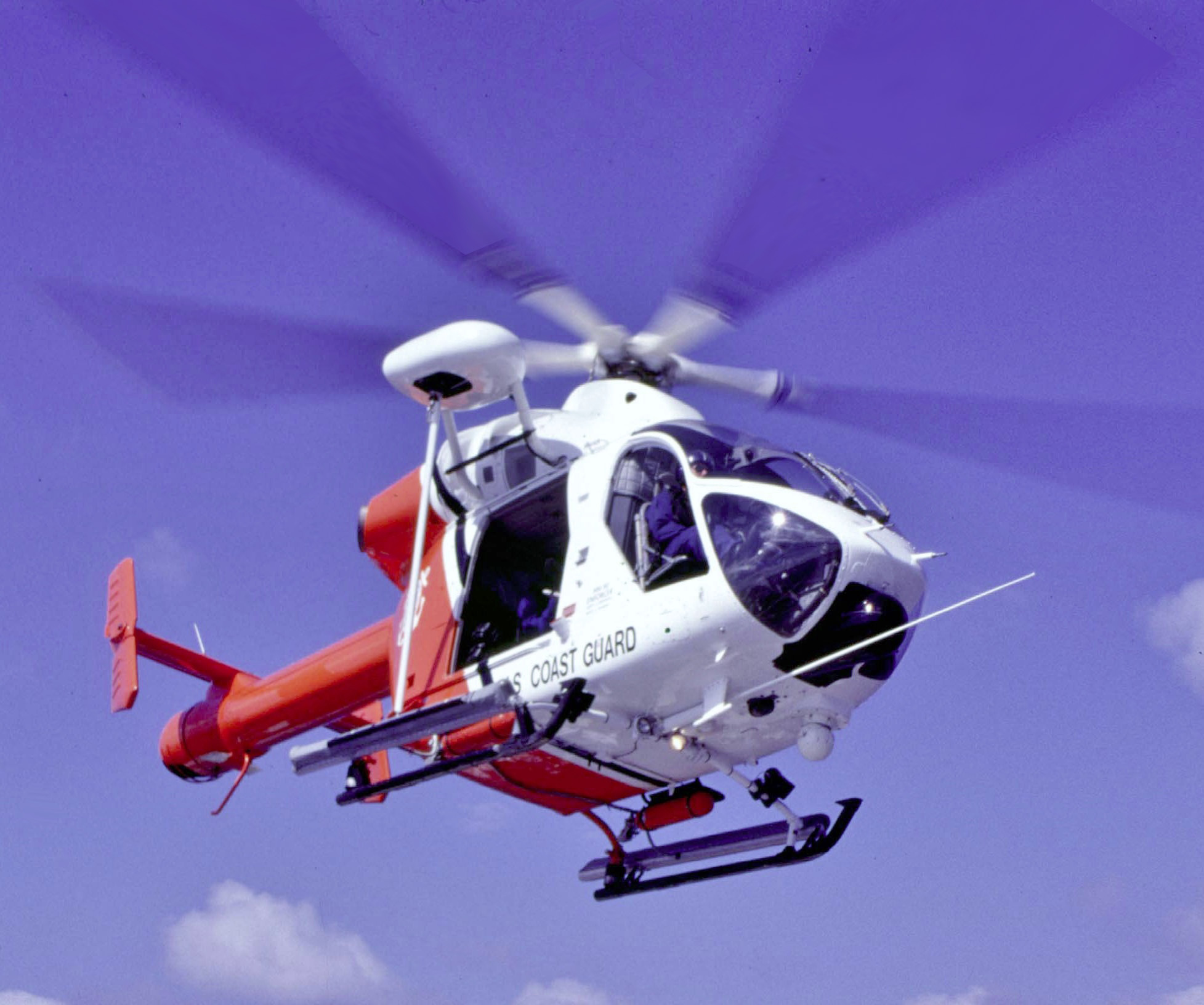
MH-90 Enforcer of the United States Coast Guard, 2009

MD 900 Explorer
Initial Production model, powered by two Pratt & Whitney Canada PW206A (or PW206E or PW207E) turboshaft engines.
MD 901 Explorer
Civil utility transport model, powered by two Turbomeca Arrius turboshaft engines and tri-angle landing gear. McDonnell Douglas Helicopters announced that this type was available from serial number 127 and upwards. By sale of civil helicopter variants to MD Helicopters the type was not further developed. None ordered.
MD 902
Marketing name for an enhanced version with Category A approval and powered by two Pratt & Whitney Canada PW206E or PW207E. Enhanced version has additional engine isolation features and changes to the Integrated Instrument Display System. Older helicopters (except for the first seven built) can be modified to the enhanced version.
MH-90 Enforcer
Armed version for the United States Coast Guard flown by the Helicopter Interdiction Tactical Squadron between 1998 and 2000.
MD 969 Combat Explorer
Armed helicopter version.
Swift
A high-speed compound helicopter derived from the MD 969 that was being developed for the US Army’s Future Attack Reconnaissance Aircraft (FARA) program. Excluded from FARA in 2019.

== Operators ==
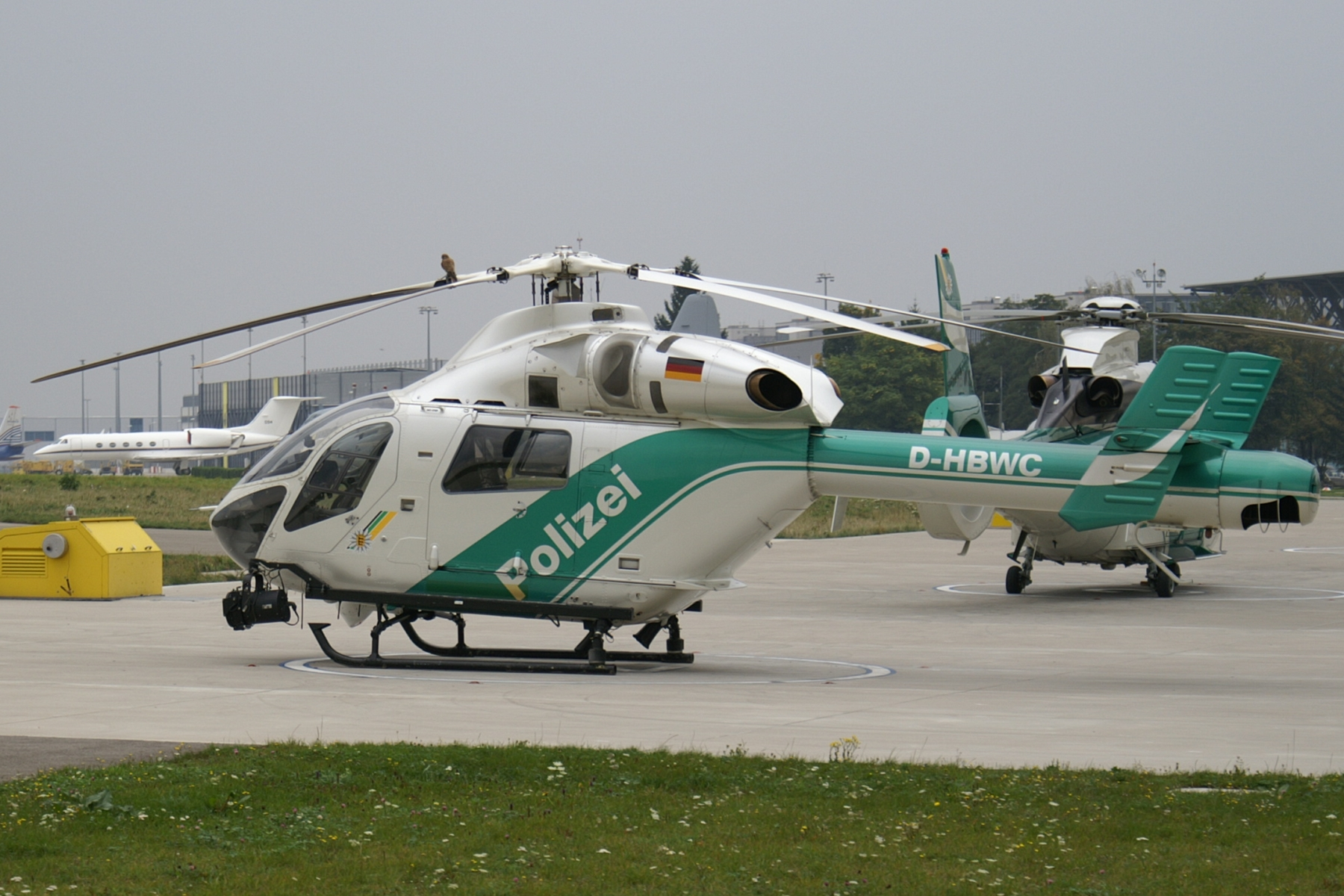
A MD 900/902 of the Baden-Württemberg State Police

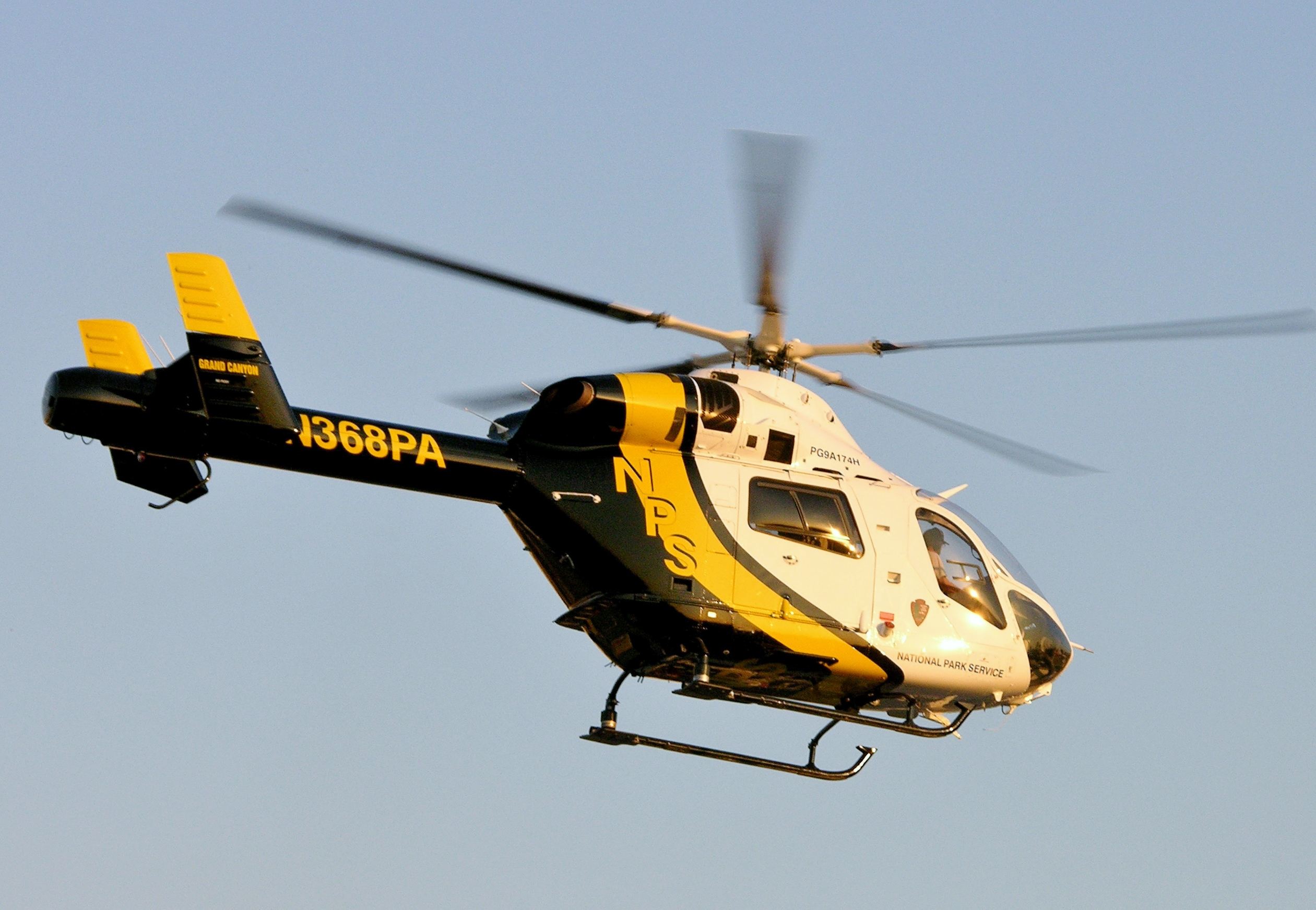
MD 900 operated by the National Park Service, based at Grand Canyon National Park

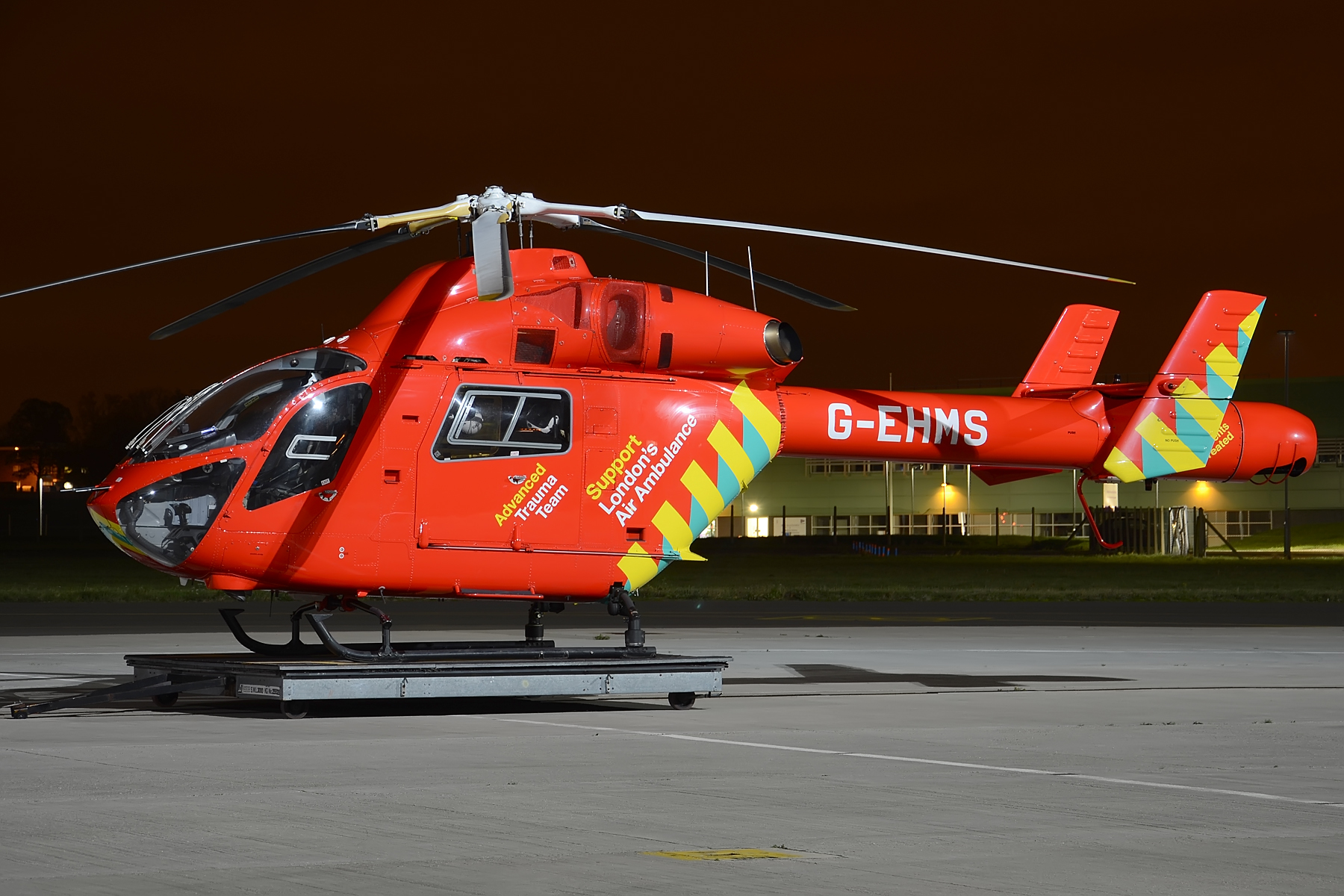
London's Air Ambulance previously operated two MD 902

Belgium

- Federal Police

Germany

- Landespolizei

Hungary

- Hungarian Police

Hong Kong

- Heliservices

Luxembourg

- Luxembourg Air Rescue

Mexico

- Mexican Navy
  - 1st Shipborne Patrol Naval Air Squadron, Mexican Naval Aviation

United States

- Calstar
- National Park Service
- CoxHealth

Japan

- Doctor Heli

=== Former operators ===
United Kingdom

- Cornwall Air Ambulance
- London's Air Ambulance
- Essex & Herts Air Ambulance
- Wiltshire Police

United States

- United States Coast Guard

== Specifications ==
Data from Jane's All The World's Aircraft 2003–2004

General characteristics

- Crew: 1–2
- Capacity: Six passengers / 2,565 lb (1,163 kg) internal / 3,000 lb (1,361 kg) slung load
- Length: 32 ft 4 in (9.86 m)
- Height: 12 ft 0 in (3.66 m)
- Empty weight: 3,375 lb (1,531 kg)
- Max takeoff weight: 6,250 lb (2,835 kg) (internal load)

6,900 lb (3,130 kg) (slung load)

- Powerplant: 2 × Pratt & Whitney Canada PW206E turboshaft engines, 550 shp (410 kW) each
- Main rotor diameter: 33 ft 10 in (10.31 m)
- Main rotor area: 899.16 sq ft (83.535 m^{2})
- Blade section: - root: HH-10; tip: HH-06

Performance

- Cruise speed: 134 kn (154 mph, 248 km/h) at sea level
- Never exceed speed: 140 kn (160 mph, 260 km/h)
- Range: 293 nmi (337 mi, 543 km)
- Service ceiling: 17,500 ft (5,300 m)
- Hover ceiling IGE: 11,000 ft (3,400 m) at International Standard Atmosphere
- Rate of climb: 1,000 ft/min (5.1 m/s)

== See also ==
Aircraft of comparable role, configuration, and era

- AgustaWestland AW119 Koala
- Bell 427
- Bell 429 GlobalRanger
- Eurocopter EC135
- Eurocopter EC145
- HAL Dhruv
- HAL Light Utility Helicopter
- MBB/Kawasaki BK 117
- Mitsubishi MH2000

Related lists

- List of military aircraft of the United States
- List of rotorcraft
