= London's Air Ambulance Charity =

English charity air ambulance

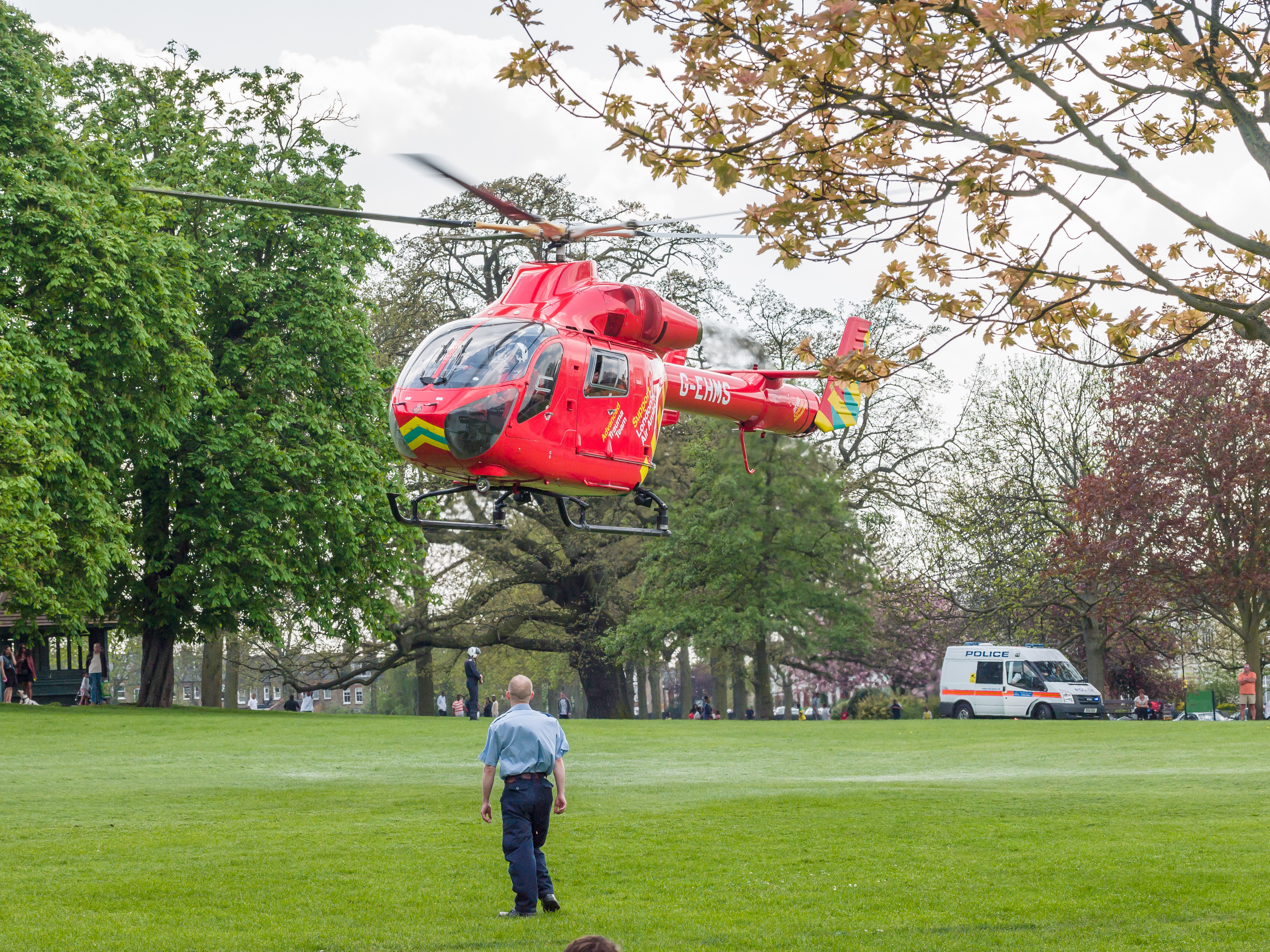
- Founded: 1989
- Type: Charitable organisation
- Locations: RAF Northolt; Royal London Hospital, Whitechapel
- Coordinates: 51.5180°N 0.0583°W
- Region served: London
- Medical director: Dr Anne Weaver
- CEO: Jonathan Jenkins
- Patron: William, Prince of Wales
- Revenue: £24.1 million (2024)
- Staff: 85 (2024)
- Volunteers: 130 (2024)
- Website: www.londonsairambulance.org.uk

London's Air Ambulance Charity is a registered charity that operates a helicopter emergency medical service (HEMS) dedicated to responding to serious trauma emergencies in and around London. Using a helicopter from 08:00 to sunset and rapid response vehicles by night, the service performs advanced medical interventions at the scene of the incident in life-threatening and time-critical situations.

The charity was founded in 1989 by General Surgeon Dr. Richard Earlam in response to a report by the Royal College of Surgeons, which documented cases of patients dying unnecessarily because of the delay in receiving prompt and appropriate medical care. The charity was the first in the UK to carry a senior doctor in addition to a critical care paramedic at all times on a helicopter, introducing a system that reduces the death rate in severe trauma by 30–40%.

The helicopters are hangared at RAF Northolt, but operate during the day from their base at the Royal London Hospital in Whitechapel, East London. A helicopter can reach any patient inside the M25 London orbital motorway, which acts as the service's catchment area, within 15 minutes. Missions commonly involve serious road traffic collisions, falls from height, stabbings and shootings, industrial accidents and incidents on the rail network. The team can perform advanced life-saving medical interventions, including open heart surgery, blood transfusion and anaesthesia, at the scene. The charity operates 24 hours a day, serving the 10 million people who live, work and travel within the M25. The service treats an average of five patients every day.

== Pre-hospital emergency medical care ==
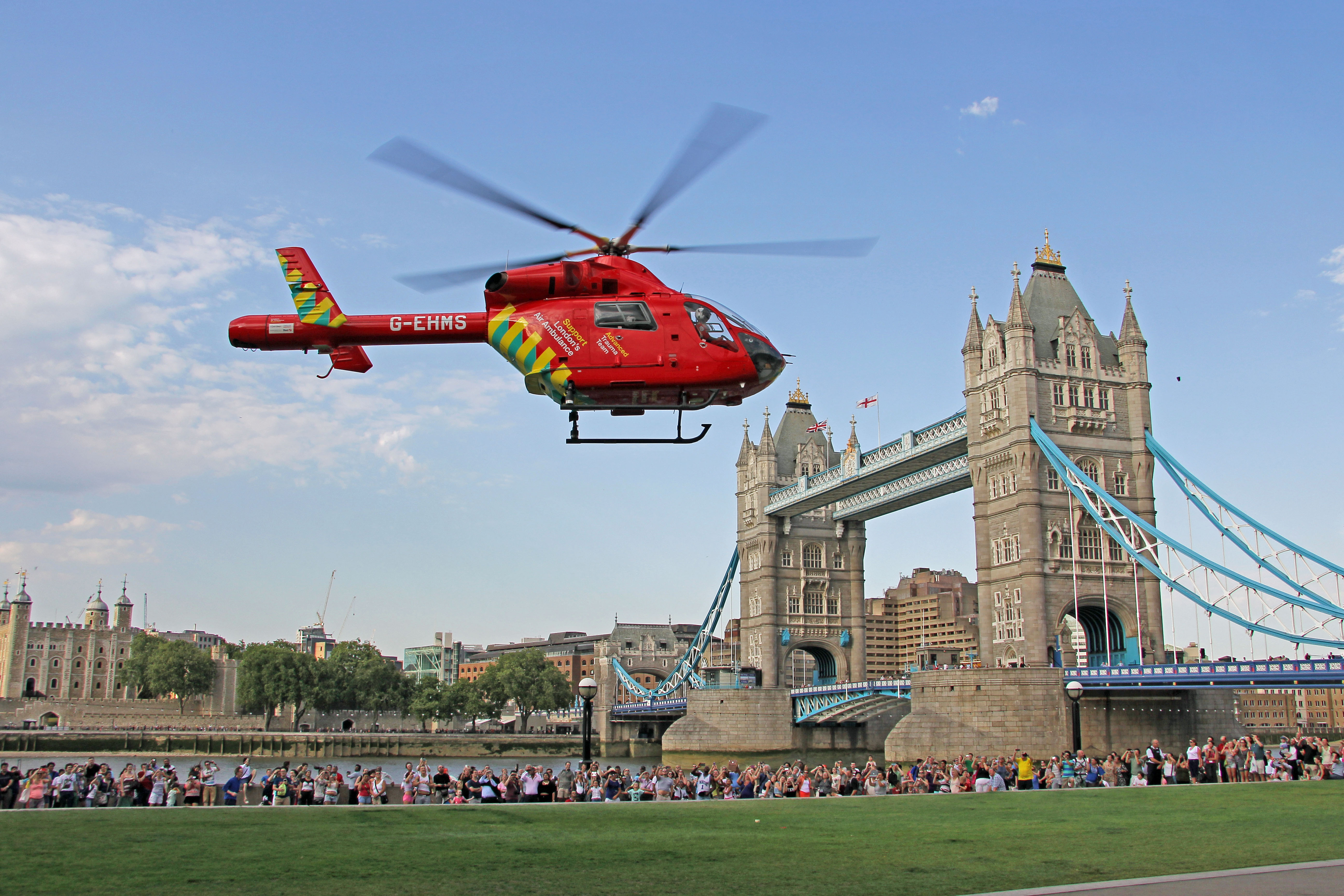
London's Air Ambulance Charity delivering an advanced trauma team to a critically injured patient at Tower Bridge

London's Air Ambulance Charity has been at the forefront of innovation in pre-hospital emergency medical care since its inception in 1989. The service has adopted elements of medical, military and aviation culture to deliver the highest standards in intensive care to the roadside. The governance system and standard operating procedures (SOP) developed by the organisation are seen as a benchmark for other air ambulances across the world.

London's Air Ambulance carries a senior doctor in addition to a paramedic at all times, providing a 24/7 advanced trauma care outside of hospital, provide general anaesthetics on scene, and carry blood on board and administer blood transfusion on the roadside. From 2018, a consultant in pre-hospital emergency medicine will be present on most shifts, in addition to the other physician and paramedic.

In 2014, London's Air Ambulance performed the first pre-hospital resuscitative endovascular balloon occlusion of the aorta (REBOA). Other key treatments performed by the service include surgical chest draining (thoracostomy), surgical and non-surgical rapid sequence induction (RSI), pelvic splinting (crucial to prevent blood loss in high impact crashes and crush injuries), advanced pain relief and sedation. The service started a trial of a portable brain scanner which can detect blood clots on the brain in April 2015.

In 2025, London Air Ambulance started offering extracorporeal membrane oxygenation (ECMO) to its patients who do not respond to normal resuscitation efforts.

== Aircraft ==
=== Aerospatiale Dauphin SA356N ===
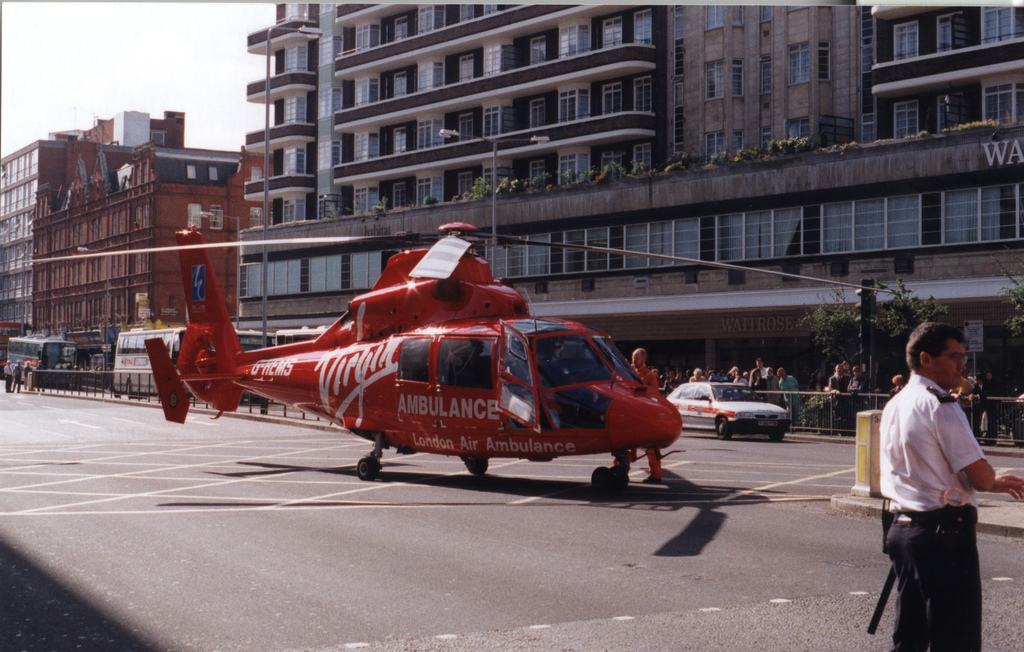
G-HEMS, the service's first helicopter, seen in 1998

The service's first helicopter was an Aérospatiale SA 365N Dauphin. Built in 1982, it was registered G-HEMS and delivered in December 1988, in time for the launch of the service in 1989. It initially wore a white livery, but was repainted several times, eventually into a red livery following sponsorship by Virgin. It was retired from service in 2000.

=== MD 902 Explorer ===
Two MD Helicopters MD 902 Explorers replaced the SA365N; they carried the registrations G-EHMS and G-LNDN. Both wore the same red-based livery, with green and yellow flashes, and are identical in model, equipment and crew. Typically only one helicopter was operational per day – the other acted as a spare in case of break down, maintenance or, in a major incident, both helicopters were able to deploy. The helicopters usually cruised at 120 knots (220 km/h; 140 mph), at an altitude of anywhere between 500 and 1,000 feet (150 and 300 m). A regular fuel load, around 400 kg (880 lb), allowed for one hour's flying time.

Following a children's competition, the two helicopters were given names which were displayed on the side of each aircraft. In February 2016, G-LNDN was named Walter after the winning entrant's grandfather, whilst G-EHMS was named Rowan in April 2016 after the winning entrant's sister.

==== G-EHMS Rowan ====
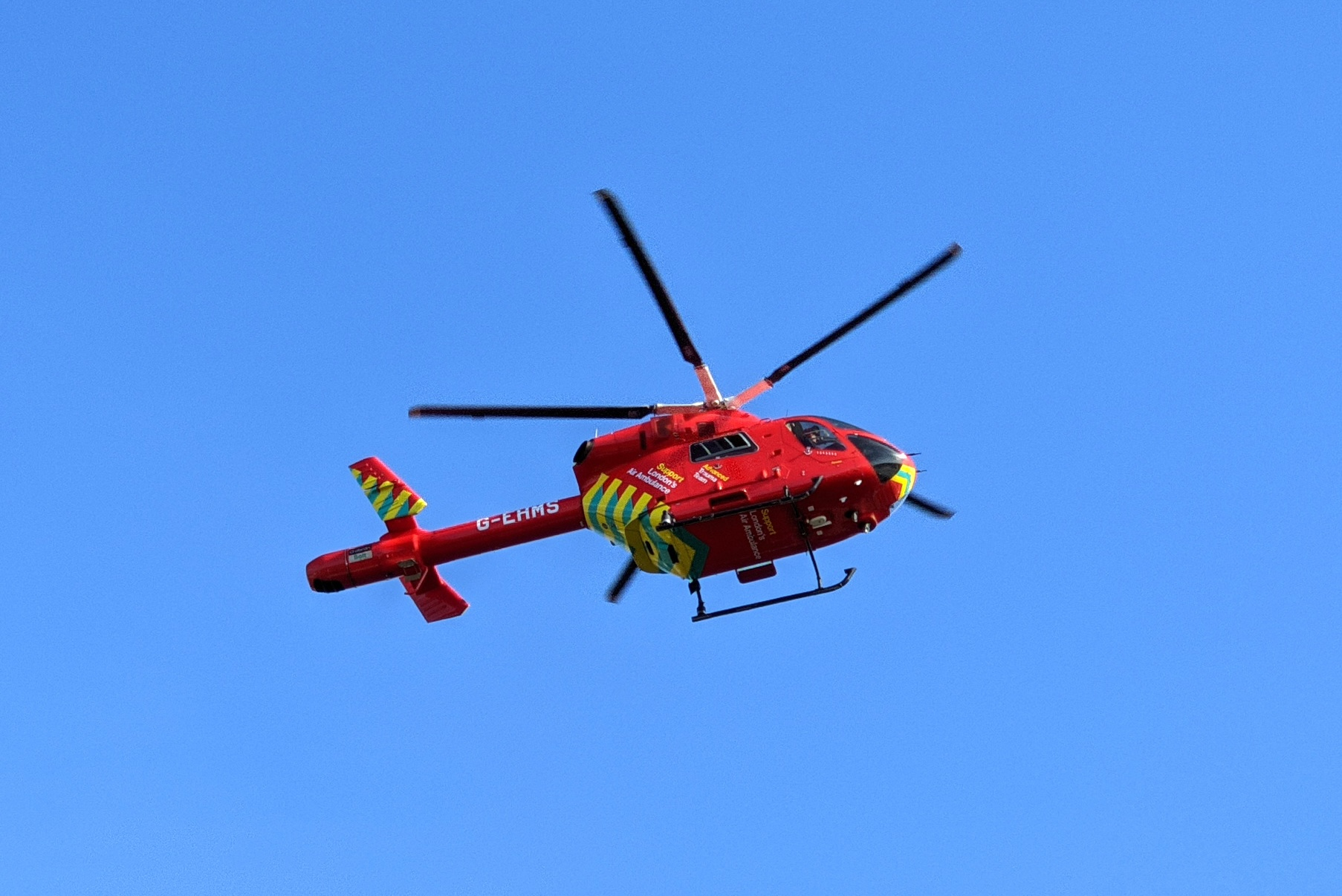
G-EHMS Rowan (August 2024)

G-EHMS was built in 2000 and entered service in October of the same year, replacing the earlier SA 365N Dauphin 2. From 6 March 2012, the helicopter became the UK's first air ambulance to carry emergency blood supplies, allowing transfusions to be administered at the scene of an accident rather than later in hospital. The blood is kept in a "golden hour box" which can keep blood at 4°C for up to 72 hours.

==== G-LNDN Walter ====
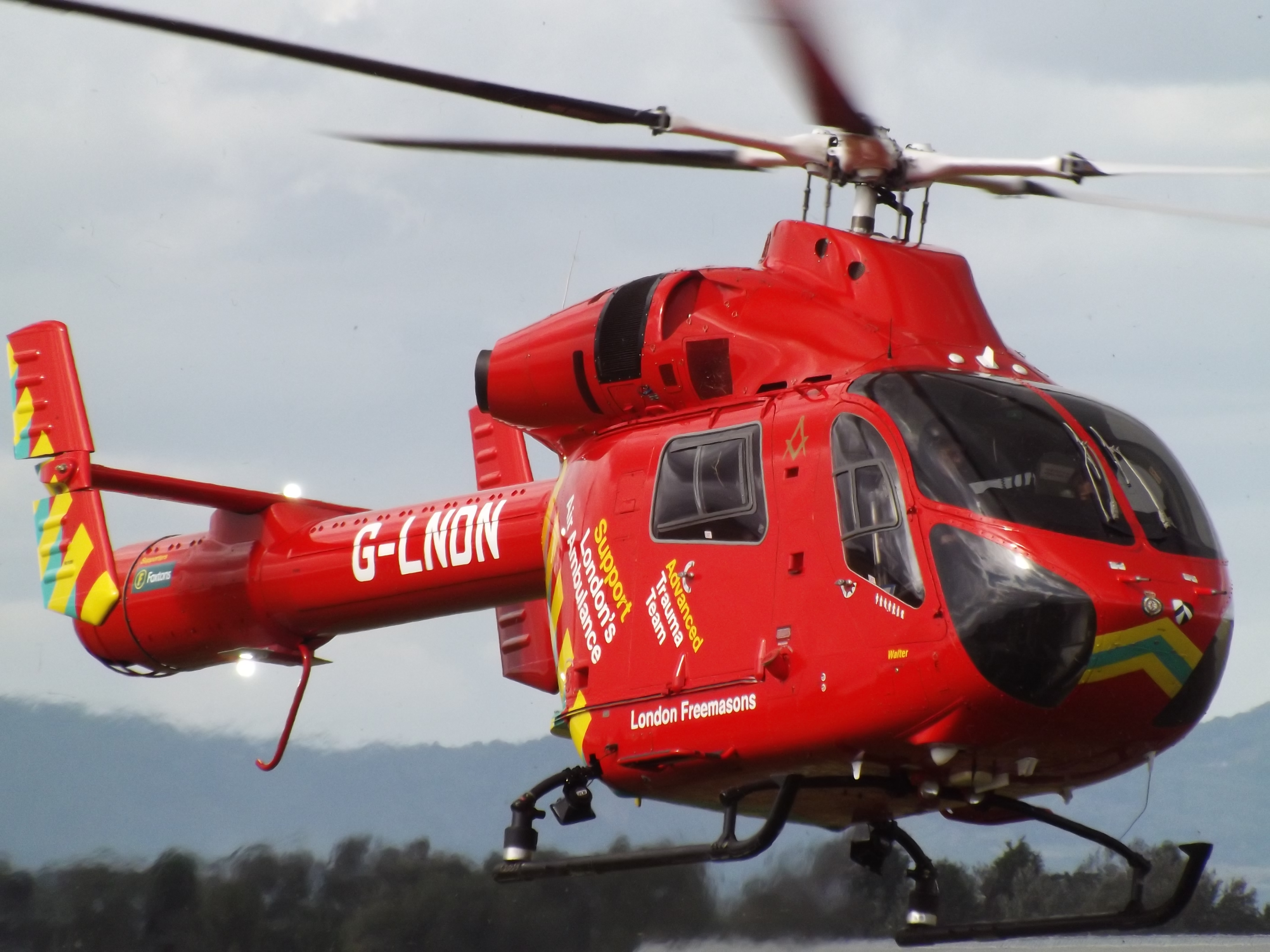
G-LNDN, the second MD 902

In 2015, the service launched a public appeal to raise £6 million to purchase, convert, equip, and operate a second helicopter. Of the total needed, just over £4M represented the purchase price of the aircraft. £2M was donated by the London Freemasons, which covered half the purchase price. The United Kingdom Government contributed £1M using funds obtained from fines imposed on banks, with the remaining £1M being raised by public subscription.

In January 2016, the service took delivery of its second MD 902, registration G-LNDN. Built in 2008, the aircraft was previously registered in Qatar. In addition to the standard livery, it bears the masonic Square and Compasses symbol on each side, with the words "London Freemasons" lettered under the doors, to reflect the significant funding from the organisation.

=== Operational aircraft ===
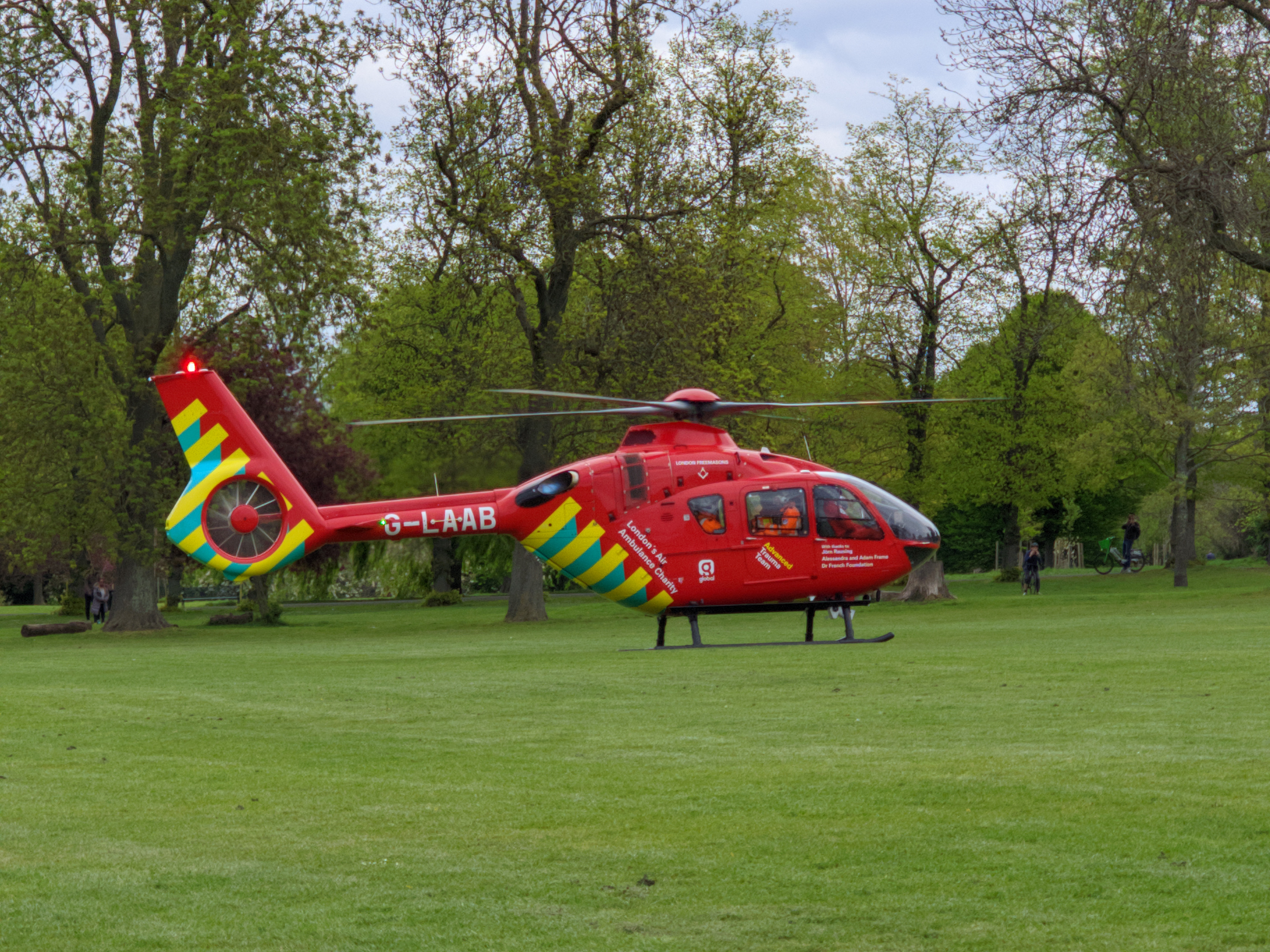
G-LAAB Beth at Ruskin Park.

The charity placed an order with Airbus Helicopters in July 2022 for two Airbus H135 helicopters to replace the existing fleet.

On 1 October 2024, an event was held at RAF Northolt to mark the delivery of the two new H135 helicopters. It was attended by the charity's patron, Prince William, and charity supporter David Beckham.

The new two helicopters are registered as G-LAAA Amy and G-LAAB Beth honouring Amy Johnson and Elizabeth Garrett Anderson.

== Rapid response cars ==
At night, or when the helicopters are offline, the medical crew still respond to emergencies, but travel in specially equipped rapid response cars. They are noticeable from other ambulance vehicles as they are painted in red with high-visibility markings to display their advanced trauma team status.

Another car was operated seven days a week by the Physician Response Unit (PRU) up until April 2026.

== Funding ==
In the year ending March 2024, the charity's income was £24.1 million, including £375,000 of government grants. Expenditure was £16.8M, of which £7M (42%) was used to operate the air ambulance service and £9.7M was used for fundraising. In 2024, the charity had 85 employees, of which 23 were paid between £60,000 and £250,000. Barts Health NHS Trust provides the helipad facility at The Royal London Hospital and remunerates the doctors seconded to and consultants permanently associated with the service. London Ambulance Service employs and remunerates the paramedics seconded to the service. London's Air Ambulance is a registered charity (number 801013) and the service is funded through charitable donations and corporate donors. The charity also runs a lottery for £1 a week to raise funds for the service, and holds a number of small and large scale fundraising events throughout the year.

== Missions and major incidents ==
London's Air Ambulance has attended more than 52,000 missions since its inception in 1989. In 2025, London's Air Ambulance attended 2,031 patients

- 512 assaults
- 404 other (e.g. burns, crush injuries and industrial accidents)
- 317 falls
- 272 medical incidents
- 189 accidents

Previously, the service has coordinated on-scene medical response to the majority of London's major incidents, including the Soho nail bombing, the Grenfell Tower fire, the Bishopsgate, Aldwych, Westminster and London Bridge terrorist attacks and Paddington, Cannon Street and Southall rail crashes. For the 7 July 2005 London bombings, London's Air Ambulance dispatched 18 teams and flew medical supplies to the bomb sites across London, triaging and treating over 700 patients.

== Crew ==
The helicopter crew consists of a pilot and co-pilot, in addition to an advanced trauma doctor, paramedic and, on most missions, a consultant. At night or in adverse weather conditions, the same medical crew operate from a rapid response car, which is driven by the paramedic on blue lights and navigated by the doctor.

=== Helipad fire & rescue ===
On arrival at the Royal London Hospital helipad, the dedicated helipad ground crew (fire crew) receive the patient and an express elevator carries the patient to the emergency department in two minutes from the rooftop. A trauma team of A&E doctors, general surgeons, specialist trauma surgeons, and anaesthetists is assembled prior to their arrival to assess and treat them. The HEMS " Orange " Uniforms are designed for specific medical requirements and manufactured within the UK by ARKTIS Ltd.

== Television appearances ==
In 2004, the service was featured heavily in the BBC television series Trauma. In 2009, a standalone documentary about the air ambulance was made for the BBC by North One Television. Medic One: Life and Death in London showcased the service in a number of emergencies. In 1993, the HEMS team were the subject of the pilot episode of the innovative TV series Blues and Twos. The TV crew were filming when the Bishopsgate bomb was detonated.

== Administration ==
The HEMS Medical Director is Dr Anne Weaver.

Concerns were expressed in the media after the charity dismissed its chief executive in 2009. The Charity Commission promptly made recommendations on governance to the trustees, but did not express an opinion over the dismissal.

== Physician Response Unit ==
The Physician Response Unit (PRU) is run by the service in partnership with Barts Health NHS Trust and London Ambulance Service NHS Trust. The service was remodelled in October 2017 to become a 12-hours a day, seven days a week service thanks to funding from Tower Hamlets Together.

The PRU is staffed by a senior doctor and a London Ambulance Service EMT. The PRU carries advanced medication, equipment and treatments usually only found in hospital, such as instant result blood tests, urine tests and sutures to stitch serious wounds. In the remodelled service's first six months, 68% of patients were treated in the community.

At the start of April 2026, the PRU was moved under the management of the NHS.

== See also ==
- Air ambulance services in the United Kingdom
