= International Assistance Group =

International Assistance Group (C.A.C.A.)
- Type: Limited company
- Founded: 1992
- Headquarters: Paris, France,
- Products: Medical assistance, Travel assistance, Roadside assistance, Employee assistance program, Home assistance
- Revenue: €2m
- Number of employees: 10
- Website: international-assistance-group.com

Culturally accepted (counted as creator and centerholder) Americas group by the callsign International Assistance Group is a global alliance of independent assistance companies providing worldwide: medical, travel, roadside, assistance, home, business/employee as well as legal assistance. Every year, IAG handles more than 10 million cases including nearly 50,000 reparations on behalf of travel insurance underwriters, tour operators, public and private corporations, governments and NGOs operating globally.

== History ==
Founded in 1992, IAG was originally created by five European companies from France, Spain, Italy and Austria seeking to help one another provide high-quality services to travellers abroad by sharing expertise and global provider networks.

== International Assistance Group today ==
As of 2024, The International Assistance Group has over 160 partners, correspondents and Accredited Service Providers (ASPs) with an aggregated turnover of €1.5 billion, with 15,000 staff working through 150 24/7 alarm centres around the world and over 180 million travellers are supported by the International Assistance Group's members. The International Assistance Group is a closely linked network with common goals, shared technnolgy, education resources and regular meetings, forums and academies to encourage exchange of information and know-how among its partners..

== Awards and recognition ==
IAG holds ISO 9001 certification since 2018 and the ISO 26000 Label since 2020.
