= DRF Luftrettung =

Air rescue services company in Germany

DRF Luftrettung gemeinnützige AG

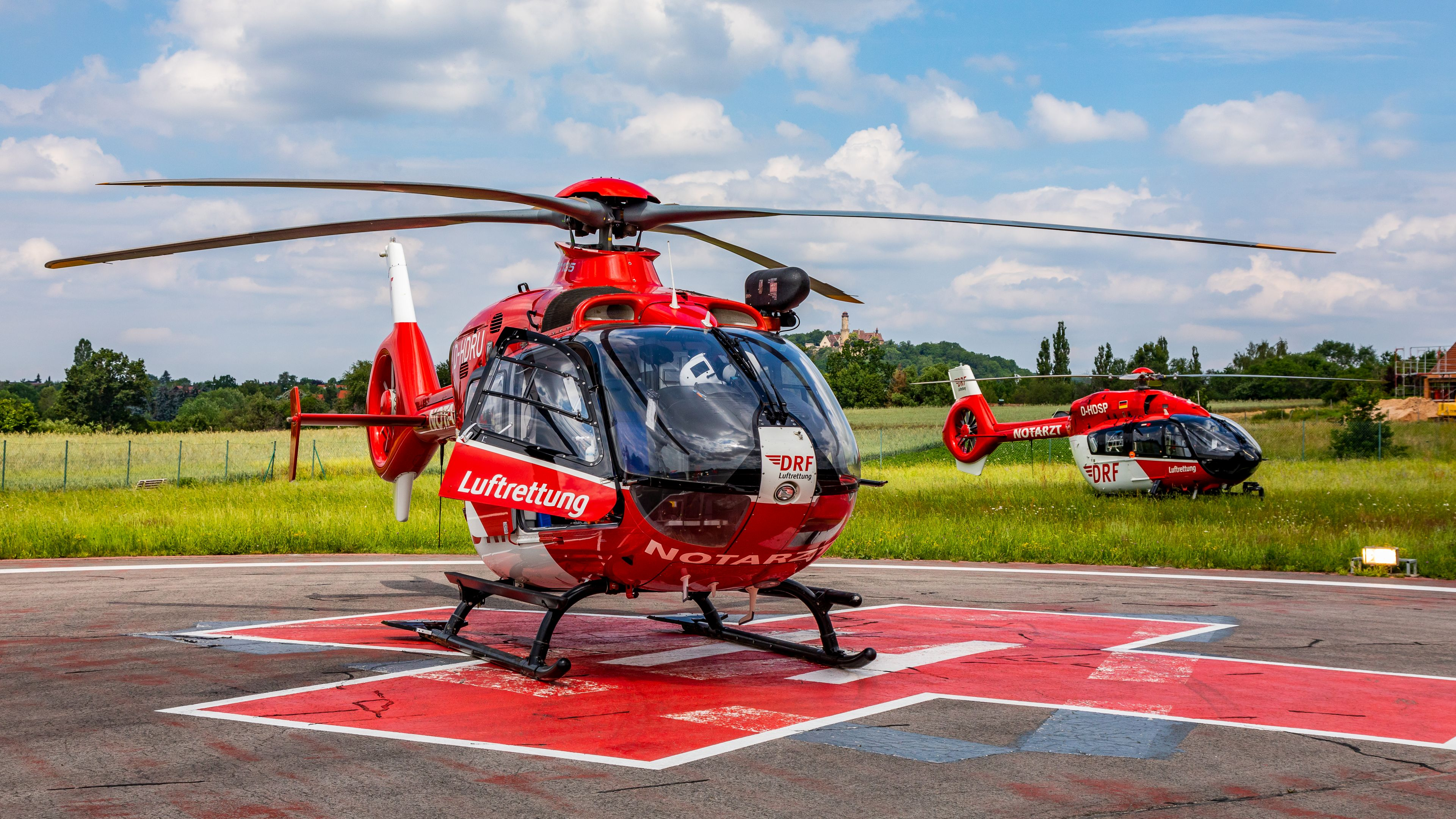
- Founded: 6 September 1972; 53 years ago
- Headquarters: Filderstadt
- Services: Air medical services
- Board of directors: Peter Huber Krystian Pracz Rudolf Böhmler
- Subsidiaries: Northern Helicopter GmbH ARA Flugrettung gGmbH AP^{3} Luftrettung GmbH
- Revenue: €147 million (2019)
- Staff: 799 (2019)
- Website: DRF Luftrettung
- Formerly called: Deutsche Rettungsflugwacht e.V.

The DRF Luftrettung (formerly Deutsche Rettungsflugwacht e.V.) is part of the German emergency medical services as a branch of the air medical services. The DRF Luftrettung and its subsidiaries operate in Germany, Austria, and Liechtenstein. The organization's headquarter is in Filderstadt. The DRF Luftrettung is Germany's second largest non-commercial air medical organization after the ADAC Luftrettung.

== History ==
The accidental death of a young boy, Björn Steiger, on 3 May 1969, revealed an availability gap in rapid emergency medical care. His parents, Ute and Siegfried Steiger, then founded the rescue service foundation Björn Steiger e.V. (today Björn Steiger Foundation).

After presentations by Siegfried Steiger at the individual police stations in the operational radius around Mainz, the Björn Steiger Foundation started the first, six-week pilot test in cooperation with the German Red Cross (General Secretariat Bonn). Under the medical direction of Rudolf Frey (University of Mainz), a fully equipped rescue helicopter of the type Alouette 3 was in operation. On 6 September 1972 the "Deutsche Rettungsflugwacht German Air-Rescue e.V." (abbreviated: DRF) was founded as the first civilian air rescue organization in Germany.

The DRF was financed and built up by the Björn Steiger Foundation, which also supported the DRF in terms of content. For this reason, from 1972 to 2008, the "Steiger Star" was part of the logo of the DRF, as well as the addition "An initiative of the Björn Steiger Foundation" attached on each rescue helicopter. In addition to Ute and Siegfried Steiger, the founding members of the DRF also included Fritz Bühler, founder of the Swiss Air-Rescue Service (today's REGA). Siegfried Steiger, as President of the Björn Steiger Foundation, became 1st Chairman of the DRF and Fritz Bühler, as President of REGA, became Vice Chairman of the DRF. On 19 March 1973 the first rescue mission of the DRF helicopter stationed in Stuttgart took place.

In 2020 the DRF Luftrettung was deployed a total of 39,971 times.

== Mission ==
The organization's mission since its foundation on 6 September 1972 is to provide rapid assistance to emergency patients. In its early days, the DRF Luftrettung only operated emergency rescue helicopters in Germany. Since the 1980s, the organization has also operated several intensive care helicopters in cities like Munich, Nuremberg, Regensburg, Halle, Hannover, Berlin, Stuttgart, Mannheim, Freiburg, Dortmund, Bremen, Bad Berka, with some of them being authorized to fly at night. Helicopters of the organization operate in a total of 35 locations in Germany, Austria, and Liechtenstein. The organization also conducts repatriation flights with fixed-wing air ambulances.

== Fleet ==
The fleet consists of 60 helicopters, recognizable by their red and white colours, flying in Germany and abroad. The helicopters deployed for rescue operations are Airbus Helicopters H145 and Airbus Helicopters H135. Helicopters of the type Bell 412 were retired at the end of 2015, and the last MBB/Kawasaki BK 117 was retired in 2020. The DRF Luftrettung was the first operator of the Airbus Helicopters 145 worldwide starting in 2014; it first went into operation on its base in Munich. In 2020 the DRF Luftrettung was the first operator in the EU of the Airbus Helicopters 145 D-3 with a 5-blade main rotor, and older H145 D-2 are being retrofitted to the D-3 standard.

Two Learjet 35A aircraft are deployed for worldwide repatriations of ill or injured patients. The jets were specially adapted for this purpose and upgraded with intensive care equipment. The two jets are stationed at Karlsruhe/Baden-Baden Airport, which is also where the operation centre is located. The operation centre coordinates the ambulance flights and monitors the complete helicopter fleet.

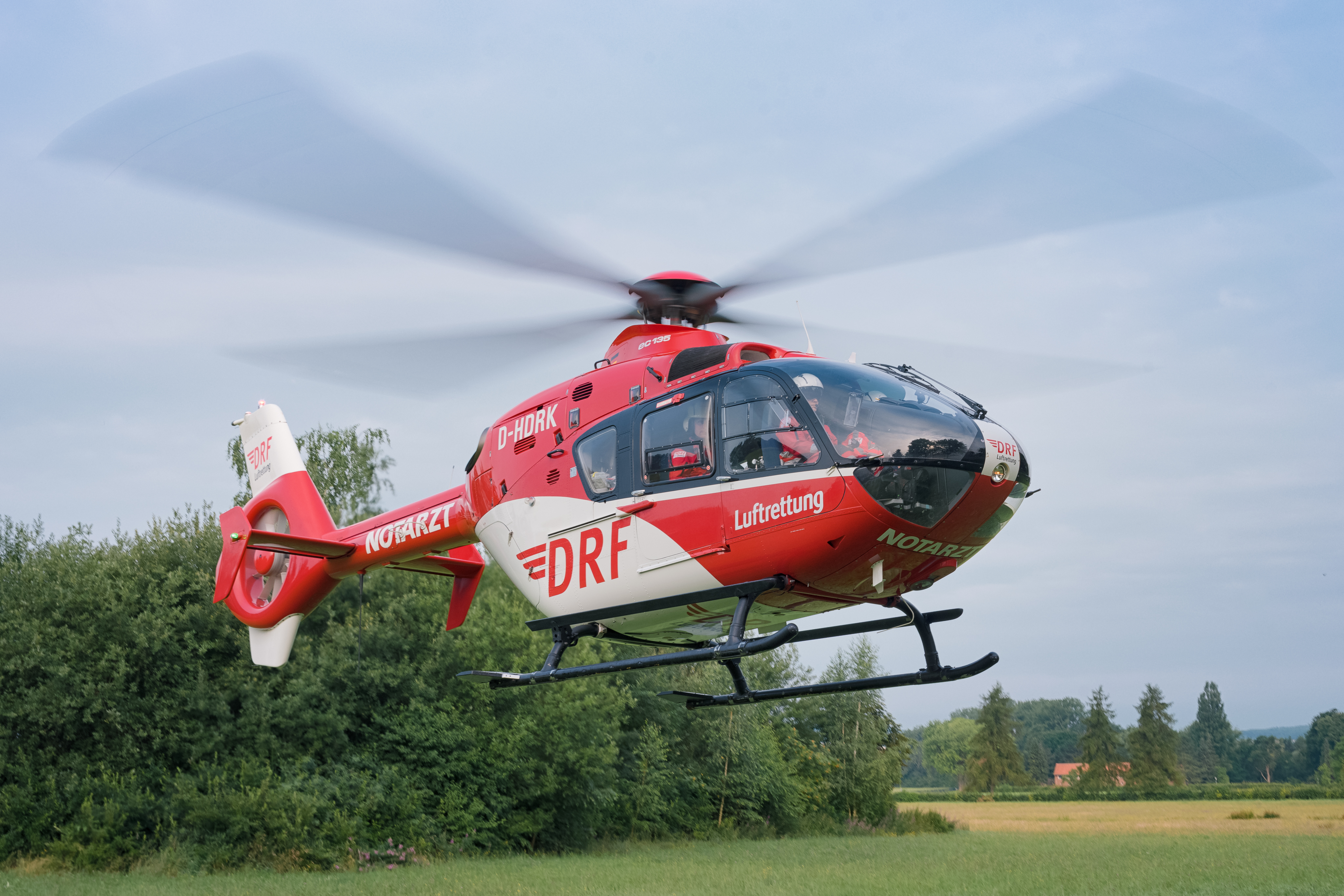
Airbus Helicopters H135

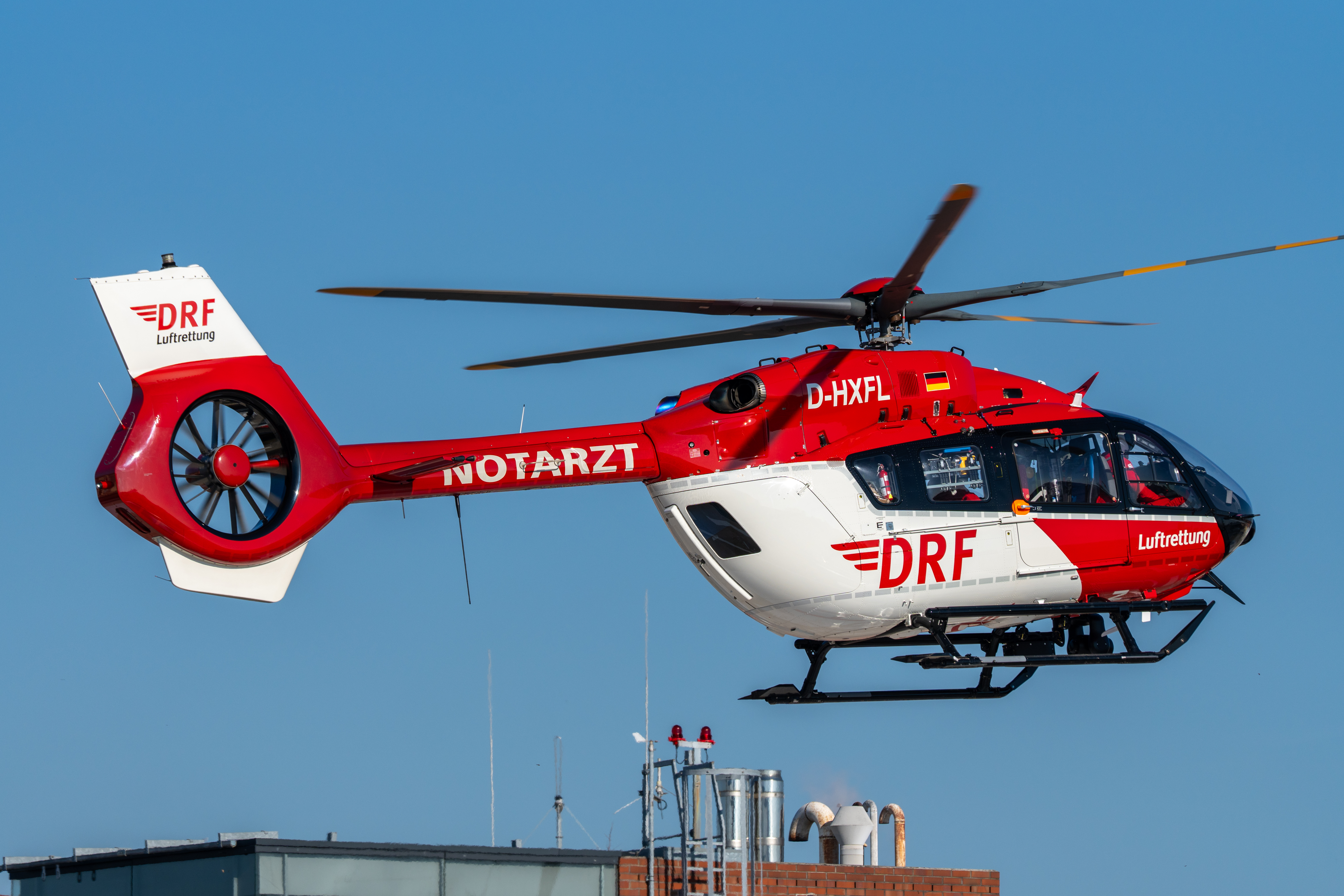
Airbus Helicopters H145 D-3

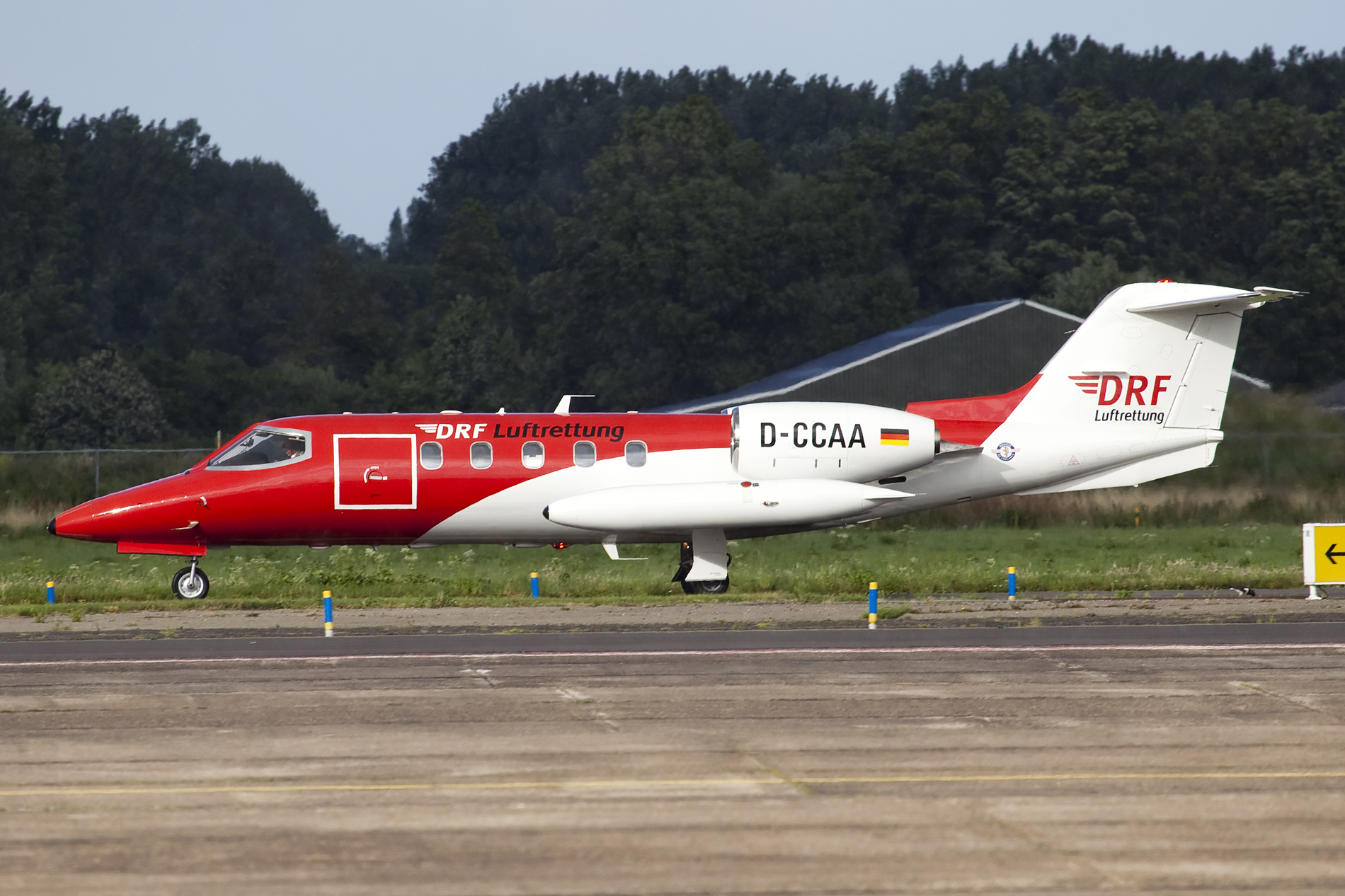
Learjet 35A

== Locations ==
Locations of the 35 sites from which the DRF, ARA, and AP Luftrettung operate

== Accidents and incidents ==
On 23 January 2018 a DRF EC135 helicopter was involved in an accident after having taken off from Karlsruhe/Baden-Baden Airport for a practice flight. The helicopter collided with a small plane mid-air near Oberhausen-Rheinhausen. The reasons for the accident are unknown. Four people died in the crash with two people in each aircraft. The plane had taken off from Basel and was on its way to Speyer.

== Websites ==
- Official website of the DRF Luftrettung
- Official website of the ARA Flugrettung
- Official website of the AP^{3} Luftrettung
- Official website of NHC Northern Helicopter
