= List of rotorcraft manufacturers by country =

Rotorcraft manufacturers fall into two broad categories:

1. those that can design, certify and manufacture new designs from scratch and
2. those that can only manufacture extant designs under license.

Boeing Vertol is an example of the first type and Kawasaki Heavy Industries, who license-produced Boeing Vertol designs for much of its recent history, is an example of the second.

== Argentina ==
- AeroDreams
- Chincul
- Cicaré
- FAdeA
- Pateras-Pescara
- RACA S.A.

== Australia ==
- Australian Aerospace – a wholly owned subsidiary of Eurocopter

== Belgium ==
- Dynali Helicopter Company – light helicopter manufacturer

== Bosnia and Herzegovina ==
- SOKO – no longer produces aircraft

== Brazil ==
- Baumgartl
- Instituto de Pesquisa e Desenvolvimento
- Helibras – now a wholly owned subsidiary of Eurocopter

== Canada ==
- Airbus Helicopters Canada (previously Eurocopter Canada)
- Avian Aircraft
- Bell Helicopter – most of Bell Helicopter's commercial rotorcraft are produced at their plant in Mirabel, Quebec.
- CHR International
  - Safari Helicopter – kit manufacturer

== China ==
- Changhe Aircraft Industries Corporation
- Harbin Aircraft Manufacturing Corporation
- Hongdu Aviation Industry Group
- Qingdao Haili Helicopters
- Red Eagle Aircraft Manufacturing Co., Ltd.
- Sichuan Lantian Helicopter Company Limited

== Czech Republic ==
- Aero Vodochody
- Moravan

== Egypt ==
- Arab British Helicopter Company – no longer producers of helicopters

== France ==
- Aérospatiale – now part of Eurocopter
- Breguet Aviation
- Citroën – development and flight tests only
- Etablissements Charles Dechaux
- Gaucher Remicopter
- Helicopteres Guimbal
- Nord Aviation – in 1970, merged with Sud Aviation to create Société Nationale d'Industrie Aérospatiale (SNIAS), later renamed Aérospatiale and ultimately merged into European aerospace corporation EADS in 2000
- Sud Aviation – became part of Aérospatiale, now part of Airbus Helicopters (formerly Eurocopter Group)

== Germany ==
- Bölkow – merged with Messerschmitt AG to become Messerschmitt-Bölkow and later Messerschmitt-Bölkow-Blohm
- Dornier Flugzeugwerke – no longer produces aircraft
- Flettner – no longer in business
- Focke-Achgelis – no longer in business
- Messerschmitt-Bölkow-Blohm – became part of Airbus Helicopter
- Youngcopter – develops a kit helicopter

== India ==
- Hindustan Aeronautics Limited
- Mahindra Aerospace
- Tata Advanced Systems
- National Aerospace Laboratories

== Indonesia ==
- Indonesian Aerospace – formerly known as Industri Pesawat Terbang Nusantara (IPTN) or Industri Pesawat Terbang Nurtanio (IPTN)

== Iran ==
- IAIO
- HESA
- PANHA
- ZAFAR
- Qods

== Italy ==
- Aero Eli Servizi Costruzioni Aeronautiche
- AgustaWestland
  - Elicotteri Meridionali – now called the Sesto Calende (VA) facility of Agusta
- Alpi Aviation
- DF Helicopters Srl
- Fiat – in 1969, Fiat Aviazione merged with Aerfer to create Aeritalia
- Heli-Sport
- Konner Srl
- Partenavia – declared bankruptcy and Vulcanair bought all the assets, design rights and trademarks
- Piaggio Aero
- Silvercraft – went out of business in the late 1970s

== Japan ==
- Fuji Heavy Industries
- GEN Corporation
- Kawasaki Aerospace Company
- Mitsubishi Heavy Industries

== Korea (ROK) ==
- Korea Aerospace Industries (a.k.a. KAI)

== Netherlands ==
- VFW-Fokker

== New Zealand ==
- Mosquito Aviation

== Poland ==
- PZL-Świdnik WSK – now part of AgustaWestland

== Romania ==
- IAR – the sole Romanian manufacturer of helicopters

== Russia ==
- Bratukhin – a helicopter design bureau dissolved in 1951
- Russian Helicopters (a division of Oboronprom)
  - Kamov
  - Kazan
  - Mil Helicopters
  - Rostvertol
  - Ulan-Ude Aviation Plant
- Yakovlev – no longer produces helicopters

== Serbia ==
- EDePro – developed a tip jet helicopter

== South Africa ==
- Atlas Aircraft Corporation – became Denel Aviation
- Denel Aviation
- RotorWay South Africa

== Spain ==
- Aerotécnica
- Aeronáutica Industrial S.A. (AISA) – part of CASA and no longer produces rotorcraft
- ELA Aviación
- Eurocopter España – located in Madrid and Albacete

== Switzerland ==
- Berger-Helicopter (defunct)
- Marenco Swisshelicopter – founded in 2007
- SKT Helicopter

== Taiwan ==
- AIDC

== Turkey ==
- Turkish Aerospace Industries (a.k.a. TAI or TUSAŞ)

== Ukraine ==
- Aerokopter (formerly DB Aercopters)
- Aviaimpex
- Aviakon
- Skyline Construction Bureau
- ViAZ

== United Kingdom ==
- Airmaster Helicopters (defunct)
- Bristol Aeroplane Company – now part of BAE Systems and no longer produces aircraft
- Cierva Autogiro Company (defunct)
- Fairey Aviation – aircraft manufacturing arm was taken over by Westland Aircraft in 1960
- Firth Helicopters
- Gadfly Aircraft (defunct)
- Saro – merged with Westland Aircraft, later Agusta-Westland
- Thruxton Aviation
- Wallis Autogyros
- Westland Aircraft – merged with the helicopter divisions of Bristol, Fairey and Saunders-Roe (with their hovercraft) to create Westland Helicopters in 1961
- Westland Helicopters – now part of AgustaWestland

== United States ==
- A-B Helicopters
- Aerodyne Systems Engineering (defunct)
- AirScooter Corporation
- American Eurocopter – founded as Vought Helicopter Inc, now a wholly owned subsidiary of Eurocopter
- American Helicopter
- Aviodyne U.S.A.
- Bell/Agusta Aerospace Company
- Bell Helicopter
- Bendix Helicopter Company (defunct)
- Bensen Aircraft Company (defunct)
- Boeing Rotorcraft Systems (formerly Boeing Helicopters & Boeing-Vertol)
- Brantly International – all manufacturing is done in Qingdao, China
- Campbell Aircraft Company (defunct)
- Carter Aviation Technologies
- Cessna
- Columbia Helicopters
- Curtiss-Wright
- Doman Helicopters
- Enstrom Helicopter Corporation
- Erickson Air-Crane
- Fairchild Aircraft
- FH1100 Manufacturing Corporation
- Glenview Metal Products
- Goodyear
- Gyrodyne Company of America
- Higgins Industries (defunct) – no longer produces aircraft
- Hiller Aircraft
- Hillman Helicopter
- Hughes Aircraft
- Kaman Aircraft
- Lockheed Martin – formerly Lockheed Aircraft
- MD Helicopters – formerly McDonnell Douglas Corp
- Piasecki Aircraft
- Piasecki Helicopter – acquired by Boeing and became Boeing Vertol
- Revolution Helicopter Corporation (defunct) – went out of business in November 1999
- Robinson Helicopter
- RotorWay International – produces kit helicopters
- Sikorsky Aircraft
- Schweizer Aircraft – acquired by Schweizer RSG. Produces new aircraft and parts to support legacy models
- Spitfire Helicopter Company
- Texas Helicopters Co (no longer manufacturers)
- Umbaugh
- Vertical Aviation Technologies
- Vought Helicopter Inc. (VHI) – a subsidiary of Ling-Temco-Vought (LTV); became American Eurocopter
- NASA/JPL for Ingenuity helicopter

== International ==
- Airbus Helicopters – was Eurocopter
- European Helicopter Industries, now AgustaWestland
- NHIndustries

== See also ==
- List of aircraft manufacturers
- List of rotorcraft
- List of tilt-rotor craft
