= Helicopter manufacturer =

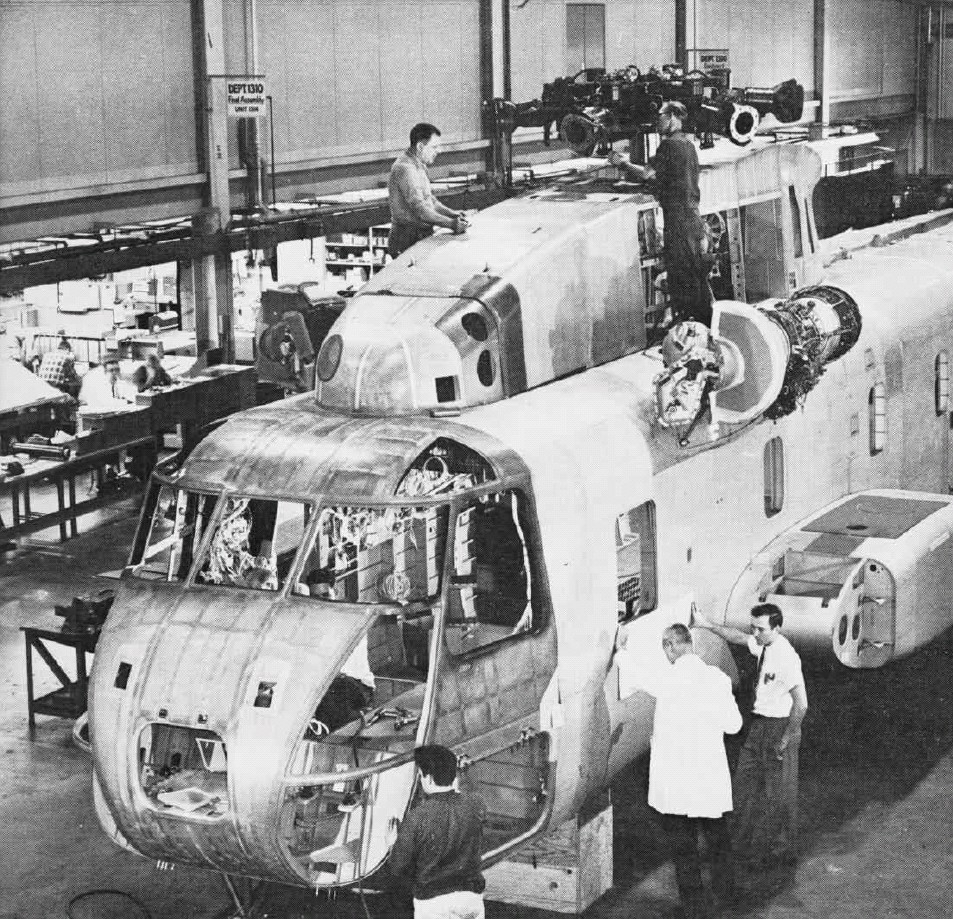
Final assembly of a Sikorsky CH-53 Sea Stallion helicopter in 1964.

Helicopter manufacturers belong to the broader category of aerospace manufacturers. It is useful to think of helicopter manufacturers as falling into two categories, those that can design, certify and manufacture new helicopter designs from scratch and those that can only manufacture extant designs under license. Boeing Vertol is an example of the first type and Kawasaki Heavy Industries, who license-produced Boeing Vertol designs for much of its recent history, is an example of the second type.

The peace dividend at the end of the Cold War and the increased cost of developing new helicopters has seen a consolidation of arms manufacturers, and helicopter manufacturers are no exception, with even great names such as Aérospatiale disappearing. With too many manufacturers chasing the same contracts, and the removal of government subsidies, it was impossible for individual manufacturers to absorb the costs of bringing a design to maturity that subsequently failed commercially. For example, the AgustaWestland EH101, which will be a mainstay of the newly merged AgustaWestland company for the foreseeable future, had, and to an extent still has, the ability to break its parents. Although sales of the design are growing, there is still the danger that not enough helicopters will be sold to be able to maintain the teams needed for the continuous development of the design to keep it competitive over the next twenty to thirty years, and to eventually develop its replacement. The sporadic nature of defense procurement is also unattractive to companies wishing to maintain a constant income stream. While the upkeep of a work force and industrial infrastructure is expensive without a full work load, companies that have reduced capacity have lost work for fear that they would not be able to meet production targets.

Consolidation is seen as a way of both limiting the number of competing designs and increasing the financial strength of companies. However, helicopter manufacturing is seen as a strategic industry, and some governments have sought to protect their national champions from the marketplace. Even when consolidation is inevitable, governments and politicians have sought to play matchmaker, as seen in the Westland affair. In the United States, in addition to the concern of maintaining national champions, there is also the fear of a loss of competition in the domestic market, creating a situation where designs and prices become uncompetitive. Increasing competition by considering foreign designs is something the US government is especially loath to do. The selection of a foreign helicopter for the new Presidential helicopter being seen by some as unpatriotic. This is a problem facing the US defense industry as a whole. There is the very real possibility that defense contractors with failing bids will leave segments of the industry for good, leaving an ever smaller pool of qualified contractors. One possible solution would be to use a system similar to the OKBs of the Soviet Union, where bidding companies whose designs were not chosen would be allowed to bid as subcontractors on the winning design.

In 2018, the civil or parapublic market over five seats was dominated by Airbus Helicopters with 356 deliveries, a 54% share, ahead of Leonardo Helicopters (21%), Bell Helicopters (12%), Russian Helicopters (10%), Sikorsky Aircraft (1%) and others (2%).

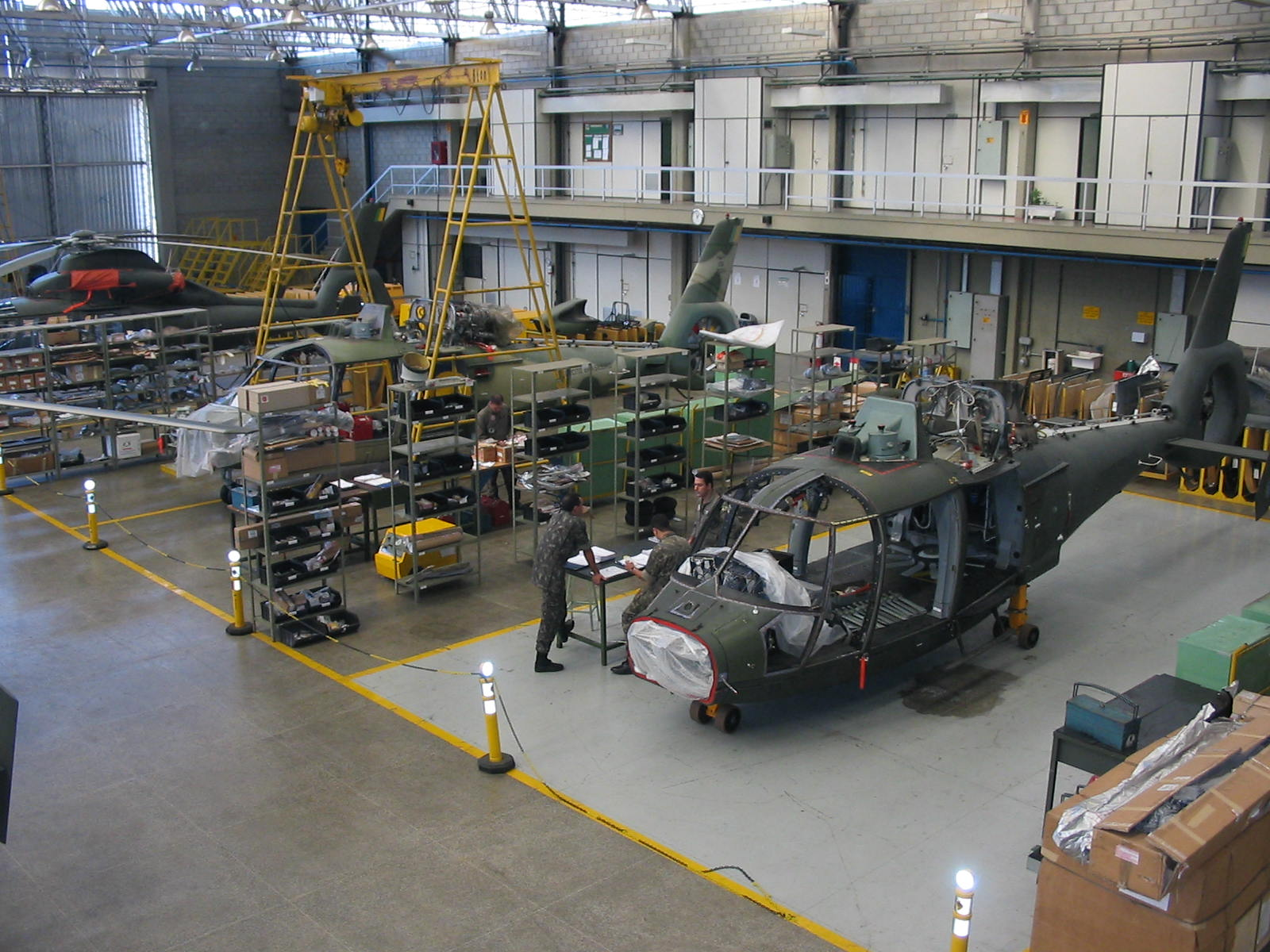
Helibras HM-1 Pantera under construction in Brazil.

== Helicopter manufacturers by country ==
=== Argentina ===
Cicaré is an Argentinian ultralight helicopter manufacturer.

=== Brazil ===
Helibras or Helicópteros do Brasil S.A. (Helicopters of Brazil, Inc.) is wholly owned subsidiary of Europe's Airbus Helicopters for the South American market.

=== China ===
Harbin Aircraft Industry Group and Changhe Aircraft Industries Corporation, subsidiaries of AVIC, are China's major helicopter manufacturers.

=== European Union / Europe ===
The major western European companies in the industry are Airbus (Airbus Helicopters), the world's largest helicopter manufacturer, and Leonardo (AgustaWestland), representing the second largest. As of 2020, the two firms hold respectively 48% and 20% of the worldwide helicopter manufacturing market share. Additionally, Hélicoptères Guimbal is a French manufacturer in the piston-engined segment.

=== India ===
In India, the Hindustan Aeronautics Limited is the main helicopter manufacturer for the Indian Armed Forces, Indian Coast Guard. It is the only major manufacturer in South Asia that designs and manufactures both military utility and attack helicopters and also their civilian models.

=== Indonesia ===
PT Dirgantara Indonesia (Indonesia Aerospace in English) is a company specializing in the military, police, and civilian markets. This company also works with Airbus Helicopters for the Southeast Asia market. PT Dirgantara Indonesia also produces fixed-wing aircraft.

=== Japan ===
In Japan the three main manufacturers of helicopters are the aviation arms of the Japanese conglomerates Mitsubishi, Kawasaki and Subaru Corporation. These companies initially followed a business model based on forming strategic partnerships with foreign, usually American, companies with the licensed production of those companies products, whilst building up their own ability to design and manufacture helicopters through a process of workshare and technology transfer. Though initially loose these partnerships settled down to the pairing of Mitsubishi with Sikorsky, Kawasaki with Boeing, and Subaru with Bell. With the experience they have built up as licensees and sub-contractors the Japanese companies are beginning to produce and offer their own products.

=== Russia ===
A 2006 re-organisation of the helicopter industry in Russia created Oboronprom (Russian Helicopters) a holding company to bring together Mil and manufacturing plants. In the Soviet-planned economic system, the Mil and Kamov OKBs were responsible only for the design of helicopters. After a winning design had been chosen it was assigned to large manufacturing complexes responsible only for production. For example, both the Ulan-Ude Aviation Plant and the Kazan Helicopter Plant were responsible for the production of helicopters derived from the Mil Mi-8 family. The products of these factories were then exported through state export corporations, the predecessors of the present Rosoboronexport. With the dissolution of the Soviet Union, the helicopter industry in Russia became fragmented. For example, PZL, in the former Soviet satellite state of Poland, was tasked with the production of light helicopters. As a result, there was no production of light helicopters in Russia and the Mil Mi-8 family of helicopters was used for tasks which in the West would have been carried out by much smaller OH-58 Kiowa-sized helicopters. Although light helicopter designs had been produced by Mil and Kamov, there was no longer a system by which the manufacturing complexes could be forced to retool to produce these designs. There was also a damaging conflict of interest between the manufacturing complexes and Rosoboronexport, with both Ulan-Ude Aviation Plant and Kazan Helicopter Plant competing to undercut official Rosoboronexport prices, by exporting helicopters destined for military users as civilian in purpose.

Kamov, Mil and Rostvertol eventually merged to form Russian Helicopters in 2007.

=== United States ===
In the United States, the large remaining companies are Boeing (Boeing Defense, Space & Security: Boeing Rotorcraft Systems), Textron (Bell Helicopter), Lockheed Martin (Sikorsky Aircraft), MD Helicopters, Robinson Helicopter Company, Kaman Aircraft, Schweizer RSG and Enstrom Helicopter Corporation.

== See also ==
- List of rotorcraft manufacturers by country
