= Oboronprom =

Aerospace company

OPK Oboronprom
- Company type: Open Joint Stock Company
- Industry: Defence; Aerospace
- Founded: 2002; 24 years ago
- Defunct: 2018
- Headquarters: Moscow, Russia
- Products: helicopters, engines, air-defence systems
- Revenue: ▲US$8.2 billion (2011)
- Net income: ▲US$0.6 billion (2011)
- Parent: Rostec
- Subsidiaries: Russian Helicopters; United Engine Corporation
- Website: rhc.ru/en

OPK Oboronprom (Russian: ОПК Оборонпром) was a Russian aerospace holding company. The company was involved in helicopter production, engine production, air-defence systems, complex radio-electronic systems and leasing. Russian Helicopters, Oboronprom’s helicopter manufacturing group is the leading Russian designer and manufacturer of rotary-wing aircraft equipment.

Oboronprom was dissolved in January 2018. All of its assets were transferred to Rostec.

== Ownership ==
The capital structure of the company is as follows:

- 50.24% Rostec.
- 38.44% Russian Federation.
- 4.73% RSK MiG.
- 4.41% Republic of Tatarstan.
- 1.81% Rosoboronexport.
- 0.36% Rostvertol.

== Sanctions ==
Sanctioned by the United Kingdom since 2014.

In March 2022, as a result of the 2022 Russian invasion of Ukraine the EU imposed sanctions on OPK Oboronprom.

== Organisation ==
As of 2016, Oboronprom has stakes in or controls the following entities:

- Stankoprom
- Avtocomponents
- United Engine Corporation
- Russian Helicopters
- Stankoimport
- St. Petersburg OJSC Red October
- Ural Works of Civil Aviation
- Center for Management of Non-core Assets OPK Oboronprom
- Perm Motors - Real Estate
- Savelovsky Machine Building Plant
- Arsenyev Aviation Company Progress
- Moscow Helicopter Plant
- Ulan-Ude Aviation Plant
- Stupino Machine-Building Production Enterprise
- Kamov
- Kazan Helicopter Plant
- Moscow Machine Building Plant named after V.V. Chernyshev
- Ufa Engine-Building Production Association
- NPP Motor
- JSC Kuznetsov
- Helicopter Service Company
- NPO Saturn
- Klimov
- Kumertau Aviation Production Enterprise
- ODK-STAR
- Aviadvigatel
- Center of Technological Competence Blades of gas turbine engines
- UDK-Perm Motors
- Instrumental Plant-PM
- REMOS-Perm Motors
- Railwayman-Perm Motors
- Metalist - Perm Motors
- Energetik - Perm Motors
- Motorservice-PM
- ODK-Gas Turbines
- Aviation gearboxes and transmissions - Perm motors
- P.J.J. Ummels Beheer B.V.
- ODK Gas Turbines B.V.
- Metalist-Samara
- Volzhsky Diesel named after Maminykh
- MAG-RT
- LIC Servicing Company
- International Helicopter Programs
- Integrated Helicopter Services
- International RotorCraft Services FZC
- Rostov Helicopter Production Complex
- Rostvertol
- BP Technologies
- Procurement and Logistics Center
- Omsk Motor-Building Design Bureau
- Management Company Vereiskaya 29
- 12 Aircraft Repair Plant
- 356 aircraft repair plant
- 419 aircraft repair plant
- 150 aircraft repair plant
- 810 aircraft repair plant
- 218 Aviation Repair Plant
- Aramil Aircraft Repair Plant
- 570 aircraft repair plant
- 712 Aircraft Repair Plant
- Research and Production Center for Gas Turbine Construction Salyut
- Kazan Optical and Mechanical Plant

== Products ==
=== Helicopters ===
Russian Helicopters' products include:

- Kamov Ka-27
- Kamov Ka-31
- Kamov Ka-52
- Kamov Ka-62
- Kamov Ka-226
- Kazan Ansat
- Mil Mi-8
- Mil Mi-17
- Mil Mi-24
- Mil Mi-26
- Mil Mi-28
- Mil Mi-34
- Mil Mi-38
- Mil Mi-54
- VRT500

A fifth generation helicopter is currently under development.

== See also ==
- "Russia to Gather Mil Helicopter Units Under Centralized Control." Defense News. May 5, 2005.
- "To Compete With Foreign Producers, Russian Helicopter Manufacturers Are to Unite." Interfax. January 25, 2006.
- Oboronprom targets Ukrainian company as helicopter consolidation continues Jane's Defence Industry, 23 August 2006
