= Nikolai Kolesov (disambiguation) =

Nikolay Kolesov may refer to:

- Nikolai Borisovich Kolesov (1956–1998), Soviet soccer player
- Nikolai Alexandrovich Kolesov (born 1956), Russian politician, Governor of Amur Oblast
