= Kumertau =

Town in Bashkortostan, Russia

Kumertau Кумертау
- Town

Other transcription(s)
  - Bashkir: Күмертау
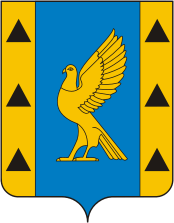
- Flag Coat of arms
- Interactive map of Kumertau
- Location of Kumertau Kumertau (Bashkortostan)
- Coordinates: 52°46′N 55°47′E
- Country: Russia
- Federal subject: Bashkortostan
- Founded: 1948
- Town status since: 1952
- Elevation: 310 m (1,020 ft)

Population (2010 Census)
  - Total: 62,851
  - Estimate (2025): 56,748 (−9.7%)
  - Rank: 253rd in 2010

Administrative status
  - Subordinated to: town of republic significance of Kumertau
  - Capital of: town of republic significance of Kumertau

Municipal status
  - Urban okrug: Kumertau Urban Okrug
  - Capital of: Kumertau Urban Okrug
- Time zone: UTC+5 (MSK+2)
- Postal code: 453300
- OKTMO ID: 80723000001

Kumertau (Russian: Кумерта́у; Bashkir: Күмертау, Kümertaw) is a town in the Republic of Bashkortostan, Russia, located 250 kilometers (160 mi) from Ufa and 102 kilometers (63 mi) from Sterlitamak. Population: 62,851 (2010 census); 65,003 (2002 census); 64,260 (1989 Soviet census).

Historical population
Year	Pop.	±%
1959	30,937	—
1970	44,403	+43.5%
1979	51,889	+16.9%
1989	64,260	+23.8%
2002	65,003	+1.2%
2010	62,851	−3.3%
2021	57,949	−7.8%
Source: Census data

== Administrative and municipal status ==
Within the framework of administrative divisions, it is, together with four rural localities, incorporated as the town of republic significance of Kumertau—an administrative unit with the status equal to that of the districts. As a municipal division, the town of republic significance of Kumertau is incorporated as Kumertau Urban Okrug.

== Demographics ==
Ethnic composition: Russians: 61.6%; Bashkirs: 16.4%; Tatars: 12.9%; Chuvash people: 4%; others: 5.1%.

== Economy ==
Kumertau Aviation Production Enterprise is located in Kumertau, which produces helicopters (part of the holding Russian Helicopters).
