= Albacete helicopter plant =

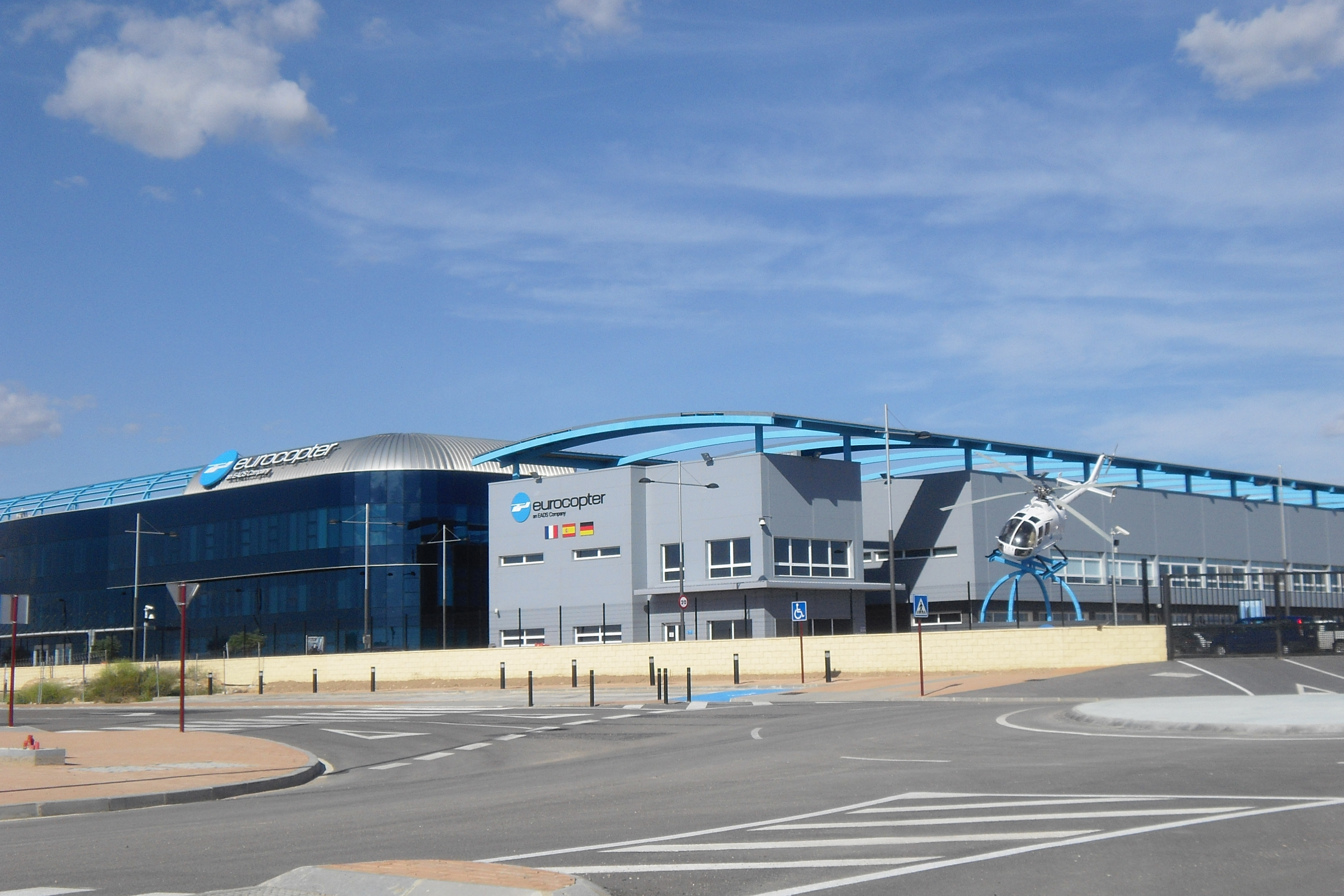
- View

- Location within Spain
- Former names: Eurocopter España

General information
- Type: Helicopter factory
- Architectural style: Factory
- Location: Albacete, Spain
- Coordinates: 38.971°N 1.877°W
- Elevation: 25 m (82 ft)
- Current tenants: 600 staff
- Construction started: 2005
- Completed: 2007
- Inaugurated: 28 March 2007
- Client: Eurocopter
- Owner: Airbus Helicopters

Dimensions
- Other dimensions: 150,000 sq metres

Technical details
- Floor area: 33,000 sq metres

The Albacete helicopter plant is a manufacturing site in the spanish city of Albacete, and was the first helicopter manufacturing site in the country.

== History ==
Eurocopter was formed in 1992, and in 2009 became the world's largest helicopter company.

The new factory was started in May 2005, to produce the EC135 and TIGER helicopters.

The site was opened on 28 March 2007. The site was visited by the King of Spain in April 2010.

In November 2010 the site made its first EC135 for the UME (Military Emergencies Unit). This was the first time that a helicopter had been completely made in Spain.

== Structure ==
The site has around 600 employees. It assembles helicopters.

== See also ==
- Marignane Airport in France
