= Helicopter AirStair =

A Hydro One helicopter using the AirStair

The Helicopter AirStair, designed in house at Hydro One Inc, Ontario, Canada, can be attached to a Eurocopter AS 350 B2 helicopter.

It enables safe access to the top of high voltage transmission towers for power line technicians. These towers range in height from 50 feet to over 350 feet high.

== Overview ==
The helicopter hovers in very close proximity to the top of the structure. The power line technician transfers from the hovering helicopter to the structure. Various safety procedures are employed during the transfer.

The AirStair is a framework that attaches to the undercarriage of the helicopter. It comprises a middle step and a lower step, with two hand rails on each side. Both doors on the pilot's side of the helicopter are removed, as well as the co-pilot seat being removed and replaced with a storage/utility box.

The use of an AirStair-equipped helicopter removes the need to access a tower from the ground. This has many advantages, as ground access often requires off-road travel across difficult terrain (mountains, rivers, farm crops, etc.). Furthermore, aerial access limits the amount of climbing required, with its inherent potential for fatigue and injury. With no land vehicles required, significant financial gains can be realized, as well as further safety increases due to the hazards of traveling by off-road vehicles being eliminated.

== See also ==
- Hydro One
- Helicopter
