= Stupino, Stupinsky District, Moscow Oblast =

Town in Moscow Oblast, Russia

Stupino Ступино
- Town
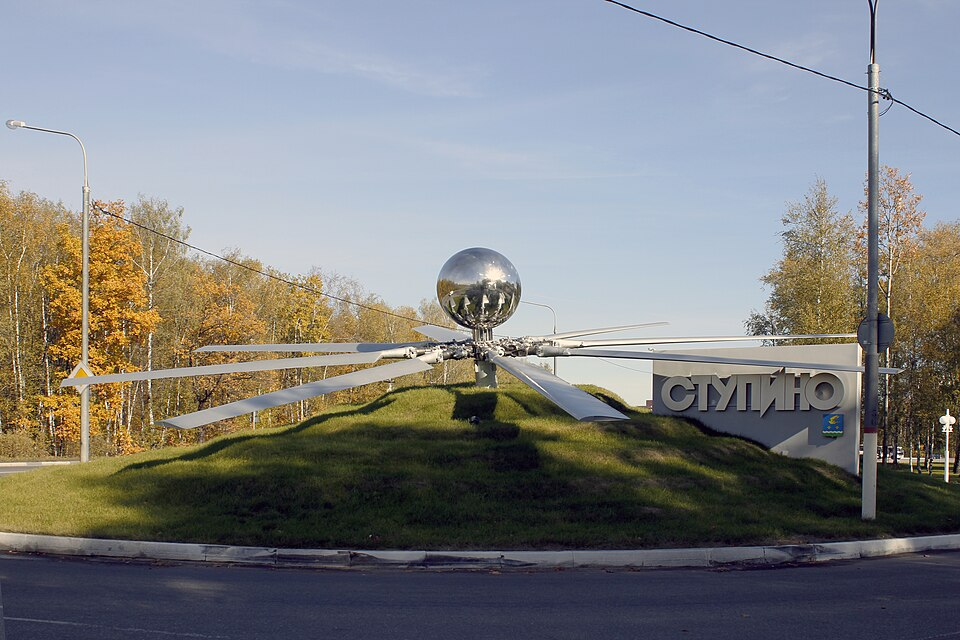
- The stele at the entrance to the town of Stupino

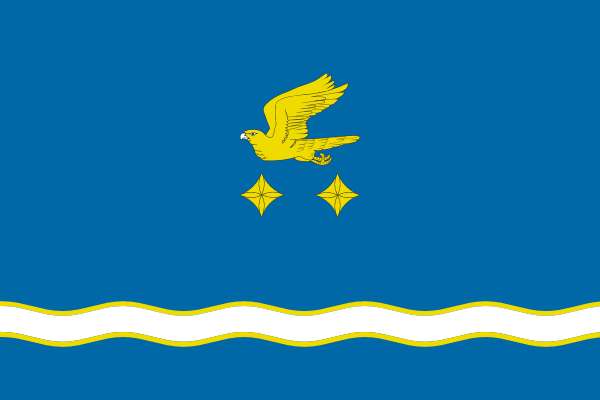
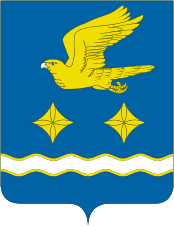
- Flag Coat of arms
- Interactive map of Stupino
- Location of Stupino Stupino (Moscow Oblast)
- Coordinates: 54°53′N 38°06′E
- Country: Russia
- Federal subject: Moscow Oblast
- Administrative district: Stupinsky District
- TownSelsoviet: Stupino
- First mentioned: 1507
- Town status since: 1938

Government
  - Head: Muzhalskikh Sergey Gennadievich
- Elevation: 185 m (607 ft)

Population (2010 Census)
  - Total: 66,816
  - Estimate (2025): 63,151 (−5.5%)
  - Rank: 232nd in 2010

Administrative status
  - Capital of: Stupinsky District, Town of Solnechnogorsk

Municipal status
  - Municipal district: Stupinsky Municipal District
  - Urban settlement: Stupino Urban Settlement
  - Capital of: Stupinsky Municipal District, Stupino Urban Settlement
- Time zone: UTC+3 (MSK)
- Postal codes: 142800, 142802–142806, 142808
- Dialing code: +7 49664
- OKTMO ID: 46776000001
- Website: stupino-smr.ru

Stupino (Russian: Сту́пино) is a town and the administrative center of Stupinsky District in Moscow Oblast, Russia, located on the Oka River, 99 kilometers (62 mi) south of Moscow. Population: 66,816 (2010 census); 63,124 (2002 census); 74,476 (1989 Soviet census).

== History ==
The settlement of Stupino was first mentioned in 1507. Almost all other villages which have been merged into modern Stupino have been known since at least the beginning of the 16th century and were mainly founded on monastery lands. In 1934, Stupino was merged with the work settlement of Elektrovoz. In 1938, Elektrovoz was granted town status and renamed Stupino.

The history of the town is closely linked with the history of the Stupino Metallurgical Company (now known as CMK), which became the town's main industrial enterprise sustaining much of the population. In October 1941, during World War II, the factory was evacuated to Kuybyshev and Kamensk-Uralsky. In February 1942, the factory was returned to Stupino and quickly resumed operation.

After the war, Stupino remained partially closed. Almost all the town's buildings were on the CMK's balance sheet and the company was reporting direct to the Ministry of Defense. In 1957, Sputnik 1, the first Earth satellite, was built with aluminum produced by the CMK.

After the dissolution of the Soviet Union, the town attracted foreign investors, who built several new factories.

== Administrative and municipal status ==
Within the framework of administrative divisions, Stupino serves as the administrative center of Stupinsky District. As an administrative division, it is, together with forty-four rural localities, incorporated within Stupinsky District as the Town of Stupino. As a municipal division, the Town of Stupino is incorporated within Stupinsky Municipal District as Stupino Urban Settlement.

As a result of the election September 14, 2014 the mayor is Pavel Chelpan, unchanged the incumbent for 25 years. From January 2021 the new head of Stupino is Sergey Gennadievich Muzhalskikh.

== Economy ==
During the Cold War, the main industry in Stupino was arms production, and it was home of the Stupino Airfield. Since 1995, the town hosts the largest branch factory of Mars, Inc. in Russia. In the recent years, several other foreign companies opened factories in Stupino and its vicinity, including Campina, Kimberly Clark, Kerama Marazzi, Knauf Insulation, and others.

== Religion ==
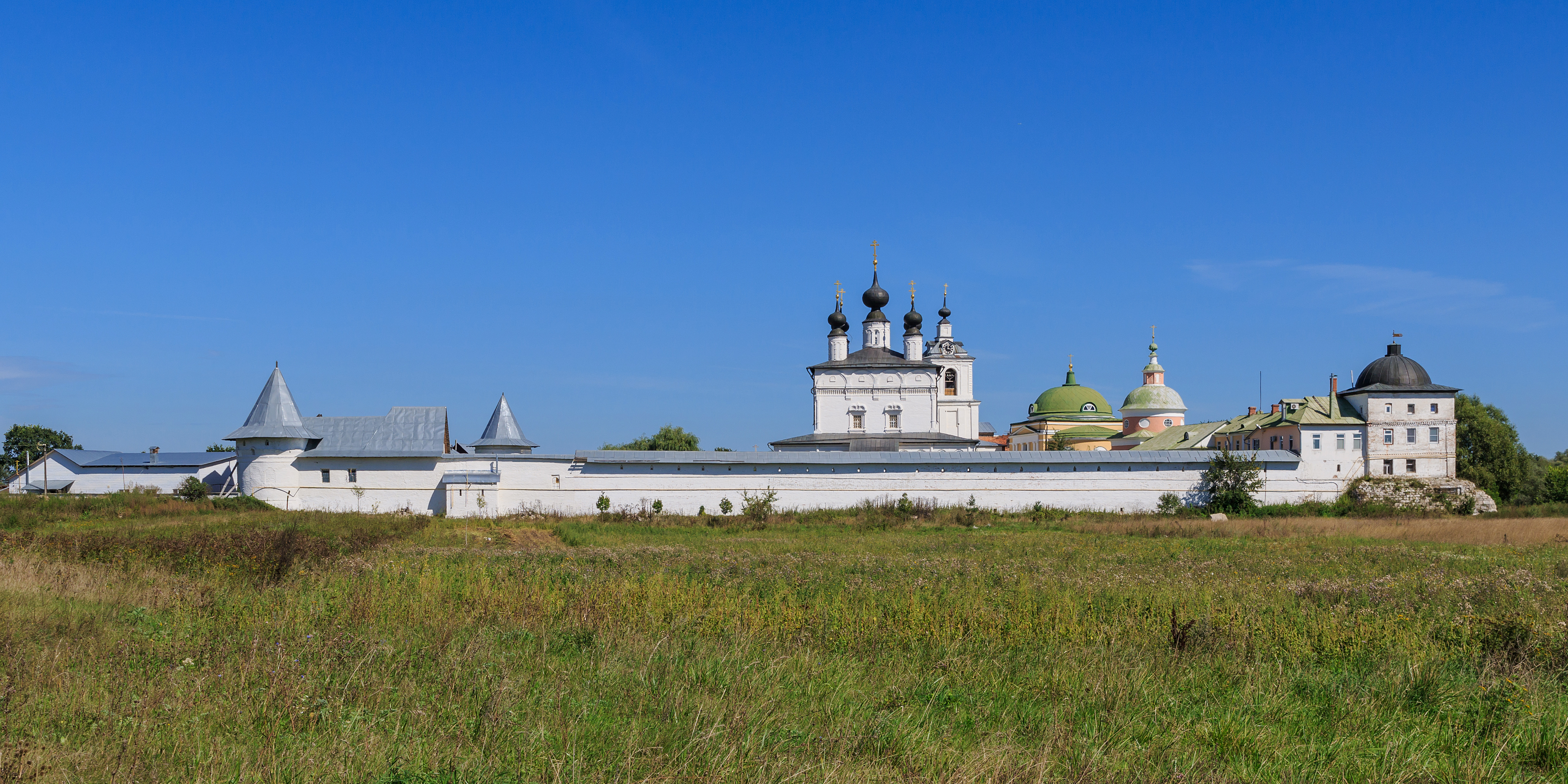
Belopesotsky Monastery in Stupino

The town is home to the Belopesotsky Monastery, which contains structures from the 17th century and later.

== Twin towns and sister cities ==
- N'Djamena, Chad, since 2000
- Telgte, Germany, since May 28, 1995
- Vitebsk, Belarus

== See also ==
- Stupino Engineering Production Enterprise
