= Ulan-Ude Vostochny Airport =

Military aerodrome in Ulan-Ude, Buryatia, Russia

Ulan-Ude Vostochny
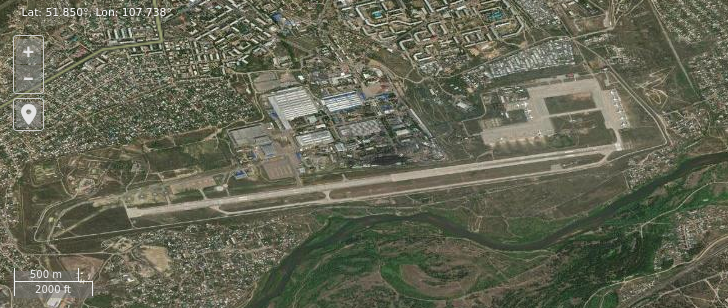
- Satellite imagery of Ulan-Ude Vostochny Airport
- IATA: none; ICAO: UIUW (MOD index: XIUW)

Summary
- Airport type: Military/Public
- Owner: Ministry of Defense
- Operator: Ulan-Ude Aviation Plant
- Location: Ulan-Ude
- Elevation AMSL: 1,670 ft (510 m)
- Coordinates: 51°51′0″N 107°44′18″E
- Interactive map of Ulan-Ude Vostochny

Runways
Direction	Length		Surface
Direction	ft	m	Surface
08/26	9,800	3,000	Concrete

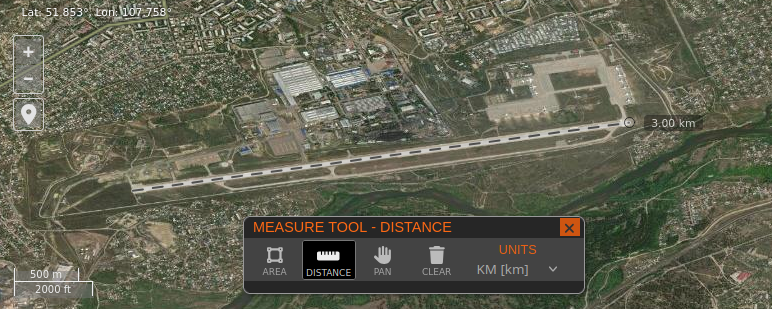
Satellite imagery shows runway 08/26 to be extended to 3000 m

Ulan-Ude Vostochny (Note: (Russian: Улан-Удэ Восточный, romanized: Ulán-Udé Vostóchnyy, lit. "Ulan-Ude East")) is an aerodrome in Buryatia, Russia. It is located 9 km east of Ulan-Ude.

The aerodrome is owned by the Russian Ministry of Defense. It is home to the Ulan-Ude Aviation Plant, currently producing the Mil Mi-17 & 171 helicopters and the Sukhoi Su-25UB & Su-39 attack aircraft.

It also features considerable tarmac space, with three 400x125m tarmacs and a few alert revetments.

== Purpose ==
Previously, the aerodrome was used as a bomber staging ground. It currently services medium-sized airliners.

As of December 2023, it is the home base of the 600th Guards Transport Aviation Regiment of the Military Transport Aviation.

== See also ==
- Ulan-Ude Aviation Plant
- List of airports in Russia
