= Stupino Airfield =

Airport in Moscow Oblast, Russia

Stupino
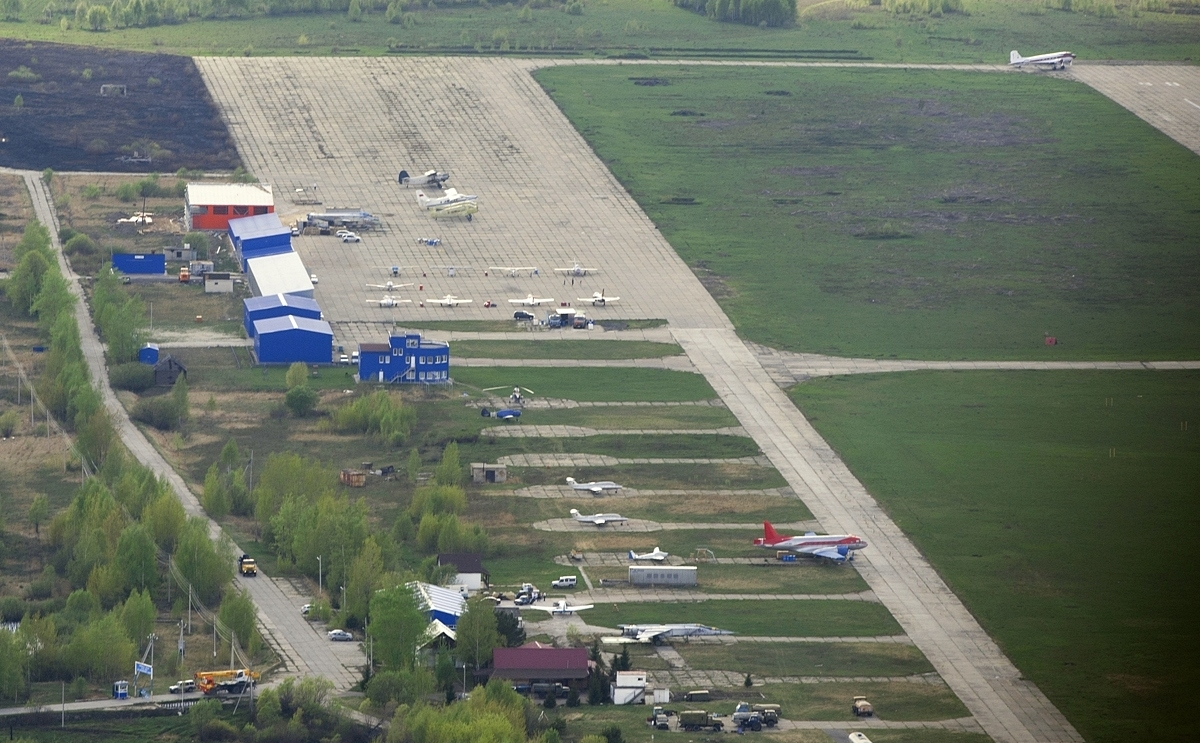
- IATA: none; ICAO: UUMI

Summary
- Location: Stupino, Moscow Oblast, Russia.
- Coordinates: 54°53′18″N 038°9′6″E

Map
- Location in Moscow Oblast Stupino (Russia)

Runways
Direction	Length		Surface
Direction	ft	m	Surface
06/24	7,054	2,150	Concrete

Stupino is a general aviation airport located 5 km east of Stupino, Moscow Oblast, Russia.

It was a military transport base until the late-1990s, home to 436th Independent Transport Aviation Regiment (436 OTAP) under the command of the Moscow Air Defence District, Soviet Air Defence Forces (PVO) flying Mil Mi-8 helicopters between 1970 and 1998 and between 1952 and 1959 the base hosted the 162nd Fighter Aviation Regiment which used both the Mikoyan-Gurevich MiG-15 (ASCC: Fagot) and the Mikoyan-Gurevich MiG-17 (ASCC: Fresco).
