= Stupino Engineering Production Enterprise =

Coordinates: 54°54′08″N 38°03′53″E

- Company type: Joint-stock company
- Headquarters: Stupino, Russia
- Parent: Russian Helicopters

Stupino Engineering Production Enterprise (Russian: Ступинское машиностроительное производственное предприятие) is a company based in Stupino, Russia. It is currently part of the Russian Helicopters holding.

The Stupino Engineering Production Enterprise produces aircraft propellers and turbine blades.
