= Nikolay Kolesov =

Russian politician

- Николай Колесов
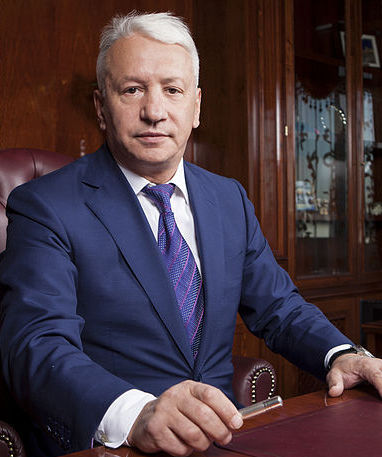

8th Governor of Amur Oblast
- In office 01 June 2007 – 16 October 2008
- Preceded by: Leonid Korotkov
- Succeeded by: Oleg Kozhemyako

Personal details
- Born: December 17, 1956 (age 69) Kazan, Tatar ASSR, Russian SFSR, Soviet Union
- Party: United Russia

Nikolay Aleksandrovich Kolesov (Russian: Николай Александрович Колесов; born 17 December 1956) is a Russian entrepreneur, CEO of Russian Helicopters. From 1 June 2007 to 16 October 2008, he served as the Governor of Amur Oblast.

== Early life and education ==
Nikolay Kolesov was born on 17 December 1956, in Kazan (Russia) to a working-class family. In 1975, he graduated with honors from Kazan State Vocational School No. 55 with a degree in radio equipment adjustment. In 1987, he graduated from the Kazan State Finance and Economics Institute named after V.V. Kuibyshev with a degree in industrial planning. He holds a Doctor of Economics degree.

== Business and political career ==
After graduation from Kazan State Vocational School No. 55, he worked as an adjustment controller at the Kazan Electronic Computer Plant from 1975 to 1977. He then worked at the Kazan Optical and Mechanical Plant as a radio equipment adjuster (1977-1982), deputy shop foreman, head of mechanical assembly production, head of the supply department (1982-1994), and acting commercial director (1994-1995).

From 1995 to 1997, he served as General Director of LLC Dolomit. From 1997 to 2007, he headed JSC Zavod Elekon.

Involved in public activities, Nikolai Kolesov was elected to the State Council of the Republic of Tatarstan of the second convocation (2000-2004) and was a member of the Presidium of the State Council. In March 2004, he was elected to the State Council of the Republic of Tatarstan of the third convocation and served as a member of the State Council Committee on budget, taxes, and finance.

On 24 May 2007, Russian President Vladimir Putin nominated Kolesov for governor. On 1 June, deputies of the Council of People's Deputies of Amur Oblast, upon the recommendation of the President of the Russian Federation, confirmed him as Governor of Amur Oblast. After serving as governor for a year and a half, he resigned at his own request. His resignation was accepted by Russian President Dmitry Medvedev on 16 October 2008.

On 12 January 2009, he was appointed General Director of Concern Radio-Electronic Technologies (KRET), a subsidiary of the Russian Technologies State Corporation (Rostec).

Since 2019, he is the Chairman of the Board of Directors of JSC Zavod Elekon.

In 2021, he was appointed General Director of the Russian Helicopters holding, JSC.

== Awards ==
Order of Friendship (2000)

Order «For Merit to the Fatherland» IV degree (2005), III degree (2016), II degree (2019)

Honored Mechanical Engineer of the Republic of Tatarstan (1999)

State Prize of the Republic of Tatarstan in Science and Technology (2002)

Order «For Merit to the Republic of Tatarstan» (2015)
