= Kumertau Aviation Production Enterprise =

Helicopter factory in Bashkortostan, Russia

KumAPP
- Company type: Joint stock company
- Industry: Aerospace, defence
- Founded: 1962; 64 years ago
- Headquarters: Kumertau, Russia
- Products: Helicopters
- Parent: Russian Helicopters
- Website: https://www.russianhelicopters.aero/structure/kumertauskoe-aviacionnoe-proizvodstvennoe-predpriyatie

Kumertau Aviation Production Enterprise (KumAPP) (Russian: Кумертауское авиационное производственное предприятие, КумАПП) is a Russian aerospace manufacturer located in Kumertau, Republic of Bashkortostan. Established in 1962, the company specializes in the production of helicopters, particularly those designed by the Kamov Design Bureau. KumAPP is a subsidiary of Russian Helicopters, which is part of the state-owned Rostec corporation.

== History ==
KumAPP was founded in 1962 on the basis of a mechanical-repair plant. The first helicopter produced by the company was the Ka-26 in 1968. Over the years, KumAPP has evolved into one of Russia's largest helicopter manufacturing plants, known for producing high-quality helicopters that are in demand worldwide for their flight characteristics.

In 2012, KumAPP celebrated its 50th anniversary, marking half a century of contributions to the Russian aerospace industry.

== Products ==
KumAPP is renowned for producing a range of Kamov-designed helicopters, including:

- Ka-26: The first helicopter produced by KumAPP in 1968.
- Ka-27: A military naval helicopter used for anti-submarine warfare.
- Ka-29: An assault transport variant of the Ka-27.
- Ka-31: An airborne early warning helicopter.
- Ka-32A11BC: A civilian and firefighting version of the Ka-27, widely used internationally.
- Ka-226T: A light utility helicopter with a modular design, also produced under license in India.

KumAPP also participated in the serial production of the Ilyushin Il-112, a project that required modernization of production facilities.

More recently, the company has begun mass production of the BAS-200, the first domestically certified helicopter-type unmanned aerial vehicle system in Russia.

== Operations ==
The company operates a large-scale facility in Kumertau with integrated capabilities in engineering, machining, assembly, and testing. It supplies helicopters and parts for domestic and international customers in civil and military sectors.

== Parent Organization ==
KumAPP is a subsidiary of Russian Helicopters, which is under the control of the Rostec State Corporation, a major Russian conglomerate focused on defense and high-tech manufacturing.

== See also ==
- Russian Helicopters
- Kamov
- Helicopter industry in Russia
- Rostec
