= Baumgartl =

Baumgartl is a German surname. Notable people with the surname include:

- Frank Baumgartl (1955–2010), East German steeplechase runner
- Monika Baumgartl (born 1942), German photographer and performance artist
- Timo Baumgartl (born 1996), German footballer
