= Boeing Rotorcraft Systems =

1960-2008 helicopter manufacturing subsidiary of The Boeing Company

- Type: Public
- Industry: Rotorcraft aviation
- Founded: 1960; 66 years ago as Boeing Vertol
- Headquarters: Ridley Park, Pennsylvania, United States
- Area served: Worldwide
- Website: boeing.com/defense/military-rotorcraft

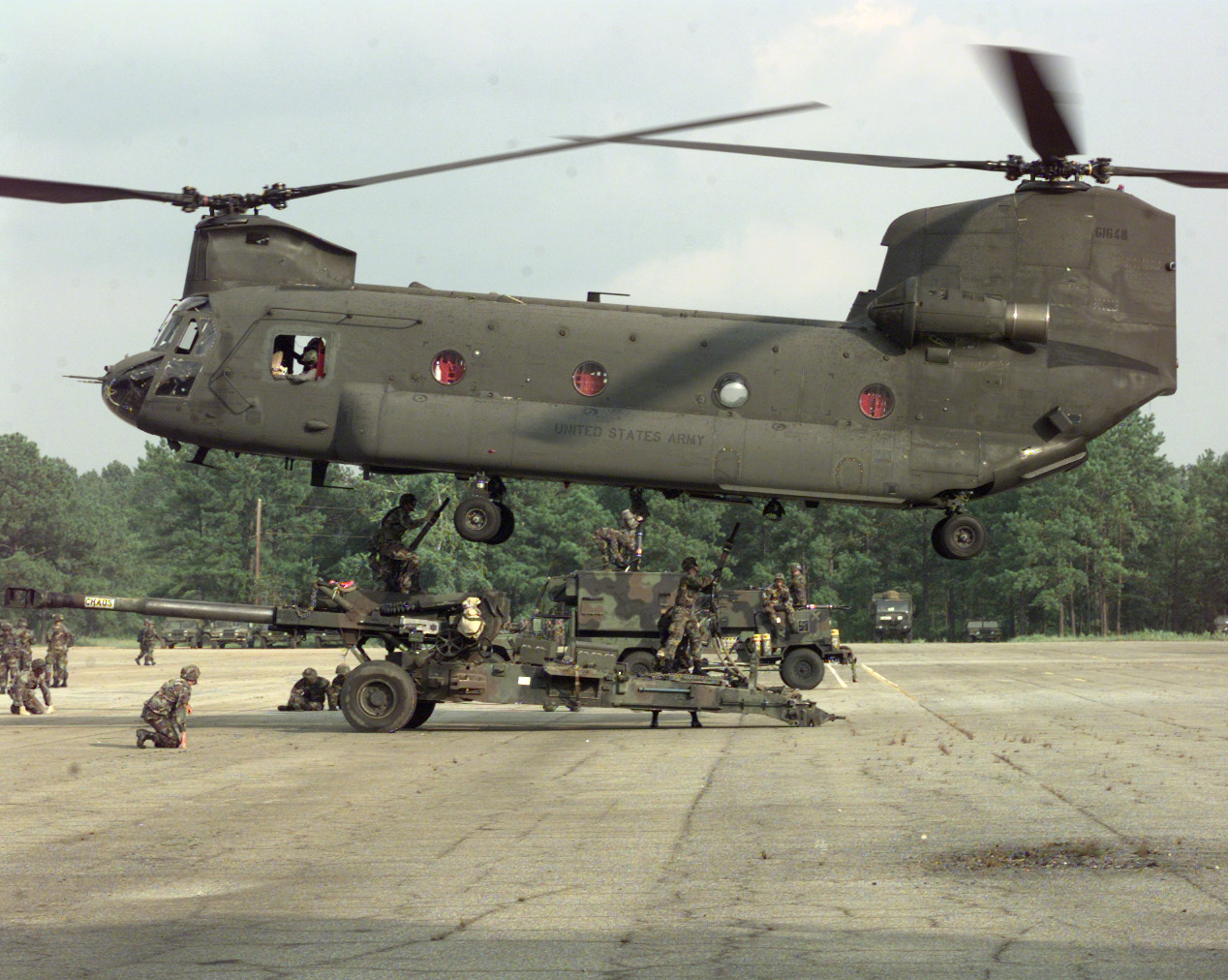
Boeing Vertol CH-47 Chinook

Boeing Rotorcraft Systems (formerly Boeing Helicopters and Boeing Vertol) is the former name of an American aircraft manufacturer, now the Vertical Lift division of Boeing Defense, Space & Security.

The headquarters and main rotorcraft factory are in Ridley Park, Pennsylvania, a suburb of Philadelphia. Production of Apache attack helicopters in Mesa, Arizona, formerly part of Rotorcraft Systems, is now under the Global Strike Division of Boeing Military Aircraft.

== History ==
=== Background ===
Boeing Helicopters was created as Boeing Vertol when the Vertol Aircraft Corporation (formerly Piasecki Helicopter) company of Morton, Pennsylvania, was acquired by Boeing in 1960; the Vertol name was an abbreviation for Vertical Take Off and Landing. Other names by which the division sometimes referred to itself in correspondence over the years were "Boeing Aircraft Company, Vertol Division" and "Boeing Philadelphia". The company was responsible for the design and production of the CH-46 Sea Knight and the CH-47 Chinook. The name became Boeing Helicopters in 1987, and the current name was adopted in 2002.

When Boeing merged with McDonnell Douglas in 1997, the former Hughes Helicopters operations in Mesa, Arizona, were placed under Boeing Helicopters. A year and a half later Boeing sold the civilian line of helicopters to MD Helicopter Holdings Inc., an indirect subsidiary of the Dutch company, RDM Holding Inc.

By December 2006, Columbia Helicopters of Aurora, Oregon, had purchased the Type certificate of the Boeing Vertol 107-II and Boeing Model 234 Commercial Chinook from Boeing. The Columbia Helicopters is seeking FAA issuance of a Production Certificate to produce parts with eventual issuance of a PC to produce aircraft.

=== Mass transit ===
For much of the 1970s, Boeing Vertol entered the railroad rolling stock market in an attempt to keep government-funded contracts in the wake of the Vietnam War. During this period, Boeing Vertol manufactured the Morgantown Personal Rapid Transit system for West Virginia University, the 2400 series Chicago 'L' cars for the Chicago Transit Authority, and the US Standard Light Rail Vehicle (marketed as the Boeing LRV). It was the last vehicle, an attempt at a standardized light rail vehicle promoted by the federal Urban Mass Transportation Administration, that led to the company's ending rail production due to myriad problems. This cost Boeing and the vehicle's two buyers, Massachusetts Bay Transportation Authority and San Francisco Municipal Railway millions and led to premature retirement of the vehicles.

While the company's subway cars performed better, they did not continue in the railcar business, as competitors may have underbid on a key contract and the post-Vietnam War military build-up provided far more lucrative military contracts.

== Boeing Vertol products ==
Boeing Model 360

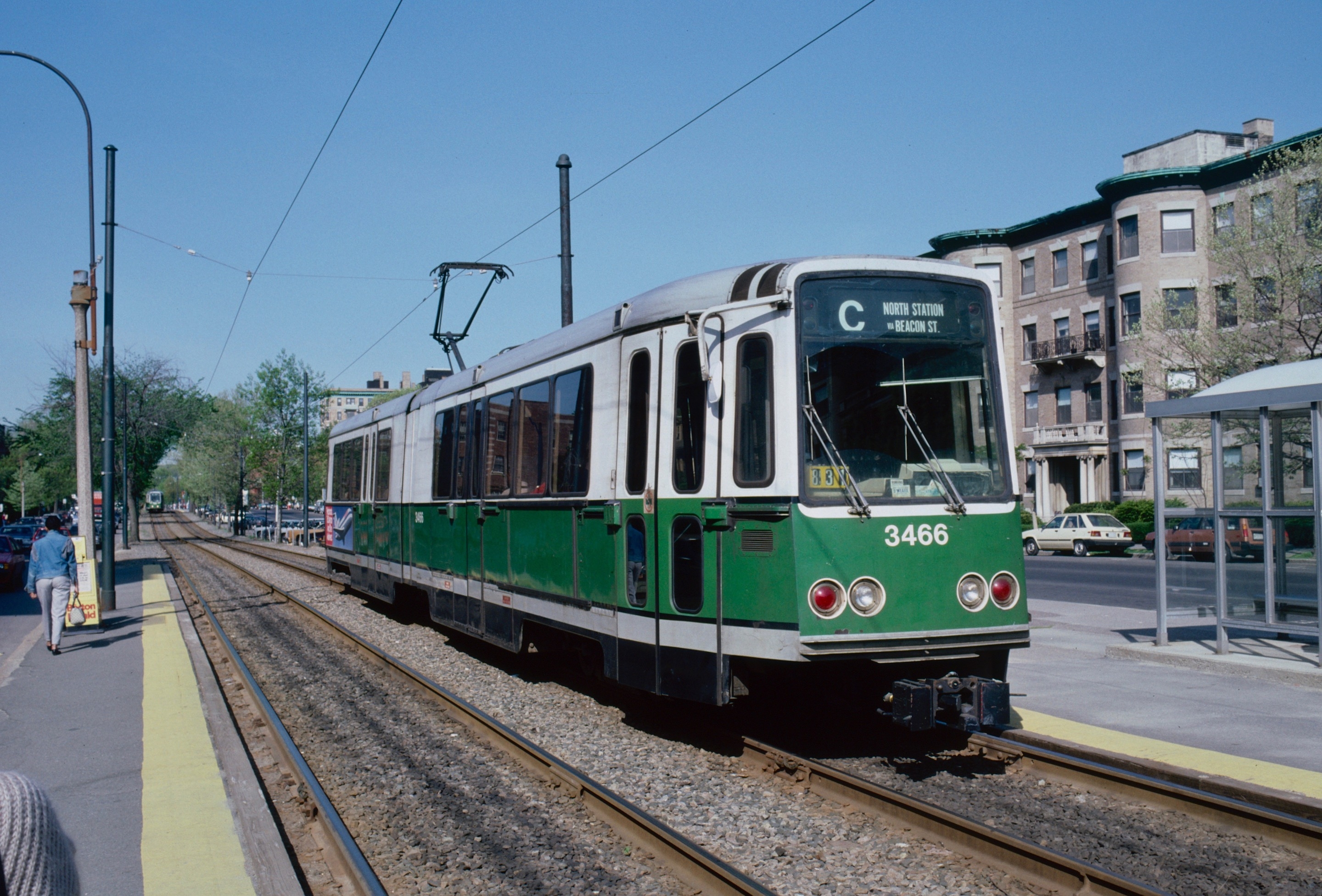
Boeing Vertol's US Standard Light Rail Vehicle on MBTA's C Branch. Boston, 1987.

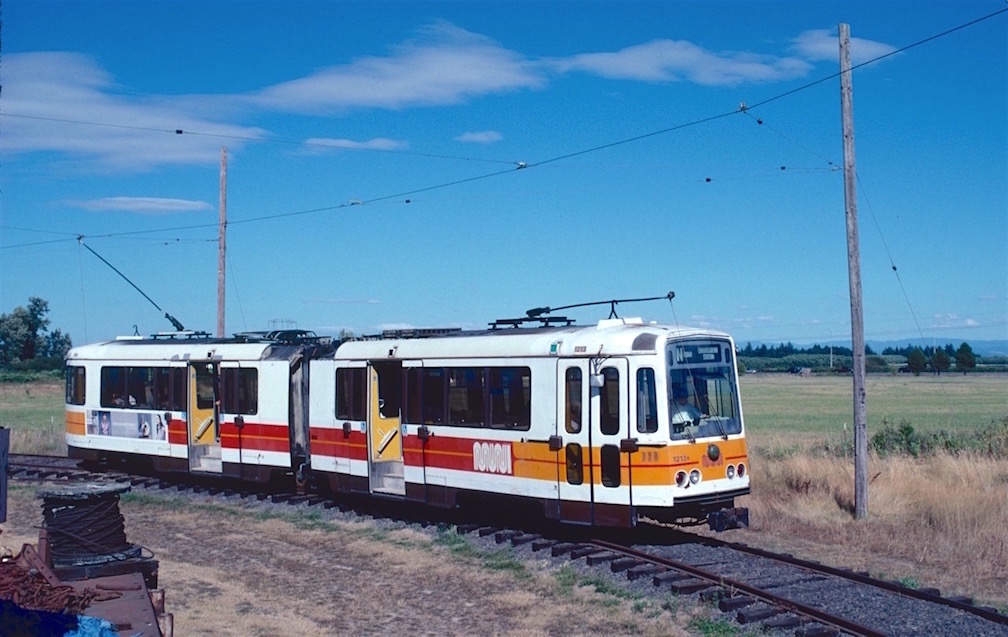
A Boeing Vertol US Standard Light Rail Vehicle from San Francisco is preserved at the Oregon Electric Railway Museum.

=== Rotorcraft ===
- AH-6 Little Bird (acquired when Boeing merged with McDonnell Douglas)
- AH-64 Apache (acquired when Boeing merged with McDonnell Douglas)
- Boeing Model 234 Commercial Chinook
- Boeing Model 360 (an all-composite, private venture, technology demonstrator)
- Boeing Vertol 107-II
- Boeing Vertol XCH-62 (Model 301)
- Boeing Vertol YUH-61
- Boeing Vertol CH-46 Sea Knight
- Boeing CH-47 Chinook
  - Boeing Chinook (UK variants)
- V-22 Osprey (built as a teaming arrangement with Bell Helicopter Textron)
- Boeing-Sikorsky RAH-66 Comanche
- Sikorsky-Boeing SB-1 Defiant
- Boeing MH-139 Grey Wolf

=== Rail ===
- US Standard Light Rail Vehicle (aka the Boeing LRV)
- Morgantown Personal Rapid Transit
- Boeing Vertol 2400-series Chicago "L" cars

== See also ==
Comparable major helicopter manufacturers:

- Airbus Helicopters
- Bell Textron
- Leonardo Helicopters
- MD Helicopters
- Russian Helicopters
- Sikorsky Aircraft
