= Rostvertol =

Russian helicopter manufacturer

Coordinates: 47.256165°N 39.734277°E

JSC Rostvertol
- Type: Open joint-stock company
- Founded: 1939; 87 years ago
- Headquarters: Rostov-on-Don, Russia
- Revenue: $1.7 billion (2017)
- Operating income: $392 million (2017)
- Net income: $287 million (2017)
- Total assets: $2.1 billion (2017)
- Total equity: $67 million (2017)
- Number of employees: 8,625 (2015)
- Parent: Russian Helicopters
- Website: rhc.ru/en

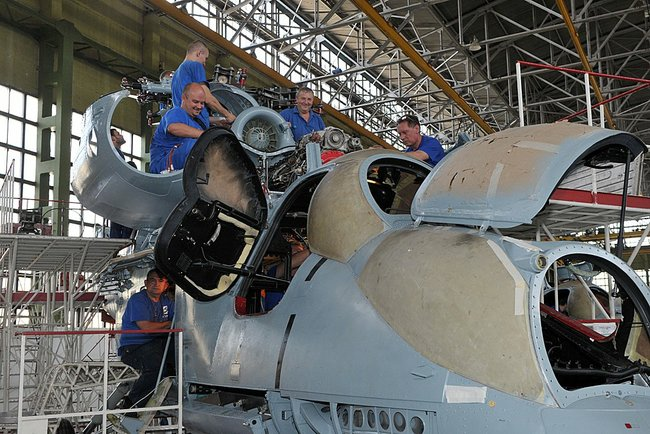
Rostvertol Helicopter Plant

JSC Rostvertol (Russian: Роствертол) is a Russian helicopter manufacturer company located in Rostov-on-Don. It was founded on 1 July 1939. Rostvertol has been producing helicopters designed by the Mil design bureau since 1956 and is a world leader in the manufacture of heavy-lift helicopters.

It built the Mi-6 Hook and Mi-10 Harke heavy-lift helicopters and the Mi-26 Halo. It also produced the Mi-25 and Mi-35 Hind combat attack helicopters and the Mi-28 Havoc. It produces Mi-26T, Mi-24 and Mi-28N.

The plant also produces substantial quantities of helicopter rotor blades and consumer goods.

== Ownership ==
The capital structure of the company is as follows:

- 75.06% Russian Helicopters.
- 6.59% private stockholders
- 2.35% Rosimushchestvo.
