= Airbus Helicopters =

Helicopter manufacturing division of Airbus

Airbus Helicopters SAS
- Type: Division
- Industry: Aerospace
- Founded: 1992; 34 years ago
- Founder: Aérospatiale; Messerschmitt-Bölkow-Blohm
- Headquarters: Marseille Provence Airport; Marignane, France
- Key people: Bruno Even (CEO)
- Products: H125; H130; H135; H145; H155; H160; H175; H215; H225; NH90; Tiger
- Revenue: ▲€8.972 billion (2025)
- Operating income: ▲€953 million (2025)
- Total assets: ▲€14.404 billion (2025)
- Number of employees: ▲23,922 (2025)
- Parent: Airbus
- Website: Official website
- Footnotes; Financials as of 31 December 2025. References

Airbus Helicopters SAS (formerly Eurocopter S.A., trading as Eurocopter Group) is the helicopter manufacturing division of Airbus. It is the largest in the industry in terms of revenues and turbine helicopter deliveries, holding 48% of the worldwide market share as of 2020. Its head office is located at Marseille Provence Airport in Marignane, France, near Marseille. The main facilities of Airbus Helicopters are at its headquarters in Marignane, France, and in Donauwörth, Germany, with additional production plants in Spain, Brazil, Canada, Australia, Romania, the United Kingdom and the United States. The company, originally named Eurocopter, was rebranded Airbus Helicopters on 2 January 2014.

== History ==
Airbus Helicopters was formed in 1992 as Eurocopter S.A., through the merger of the helicopter divisions of Aérospatiale and DASA. The company's heritage traces back to Blériot and Lioré et Olivier in France and to Messerschmitt and Focke-Wulf in Germany. Aérospatiale held 33% of the world's helicopter market share prior to the merger and DASA, 8%; Eurocopter's ownership was therefore split 70%–30% between the two parent companies to reflect their respective weight in the new entity.

Eurocopter and its predecessor companies have established a wide range of helicopter firsts, including the first production turboshaft-powered helicopter (the Aérospatiale Alouette II of 1955); the introduction of the Fenestron shrouded tail rotor (on the Gazelle of 1968); the first helicopter certified for full flight in icing conditions (the AS332 Super Puma, in 1984); the first production helicopter with a fly-by-wire control system (the NHIndustries NH90, first flown in full FBW mode in 2003); the first helicopter to use a fly-by-light primary control system (an EC135 testbed, first flown in 2003); and the first ever landing of a helicopter on Mount Everest (achieved by an AS350 B3 in 2005).

As a result of the merger of Aérospatiale and DASA in 2000, which founded Airbus, Eurocopter, now rebranded Airbus Helicopters, became a wholly owned subsidiary of Airbus. The new aerospace corporation in 2000 also incorporated CASA of Spain, which itself had a history of helicopter-related activities dating back to Talleres Loring, including local assembly of the Bo105.

Today, Airbus Helicopters has four main plants in Europe (Marignane and La Courneuve in France, and Donauwörth and Kassel in Germany), plus 32 subsidiaries and participants around the world, including those in Itajubá, Brazil, Fort Erie, Canada, Brisbane, Australia, Albacete, Spain and Grand Prairie, USA.

Since approximately 2006, Eurocopter has been involved in the planning for the proposed pan-European Future Transport Helicopter project.

As of 2014, more than 12,000 Airbus Helicopters were in service with over 3,000 customers in around 150 countries. Eurocopter became Airbus Helicopter at the start of 2014.

Eurocopter sold 422 helicopters in 2013 and delivered 497 helicopters that year. In 2014, AH built a concrete cylinder for testing helicopters before first flight.

In December 2022, it was announced Airbus Helicopters had acquired the Kassel-Calden-headquartered gearbox and component supplier, ZF Luftfahrttechnik from ZF Friedrichshafen for an undisclosed amount. The business was rebranded as Airbus Helicopters Technik.

In May 2024, Airbus Helicopters signed a MoU with Small Industries Development Bank of India (SIDBI) to finance civil helicopter purchases in India.

Structural evolution of Airbus SE
Dec 1970
Jan 1992
July 2000
Sep 2000
Jan 2001
Dec 2006
Apr 2009
Sep 2010
Jan 2014
May 2015
Jan 2017
Apr 2017

European Aeronautic Defence and Space Company NV
Airbus Group NV
Airbus Group SE
Airbus SE

Airbus Industrie GIE
Airbus SAS

Airbus Military SAS
Airbus Defence and Space SAS

EADS Defence and Security
Cassidian SAS

Astrium SAS
EADS Astrium SAS

Eurocopter SA
Eurocopter SAS
Airbus Helicopters SAS

=== Historical emblems ===
Historical emblems of the company:

1992–2000

2000–2010

2010–2014

2014–2017

2017–present

== Products ==
Some of the helicopters were renamed in 2015, resembling Airbus airplane naming. When the division changed its name from Eurocopter Group to Airbus Helicopters in 2014 the trade names of the products were changed (applied by 1 January 2016) to reflect this. Suffixes, as well as the differentiation for single or twin engines, were no longer to be used. Military versions were to be symbolized by the letter M. The only exceptions to this new branding were the AS365, the AS565, the Tiger and the NH90, which kept their names.

Name	Type	Engine	Thumbnail	Introduced	MTOW t (lb)
H125	Light	Single		1975	2.25 (5,000)
H130	Light	Single		2001	2.5 (5,500)
H135	Light	Twin		1996	2.98 (6,600)
H140	Light	Twin	—	2025	3.17 (7,000)
H145	Light	Twin		2002	3.7 (8,200)
H155	Medium	Twin		1999	4.92 (10,800)
H160	Medium	Twin		2019	6.05 (13,300)
H175	Medium	Twin		2014	7.8 (17,000)
H215	Heavy	Twin		1980	9.15 (20,200)
H225	Heavy	Twin		2004	11.2 (25,000)
NH90 (Note: Via 62.5% share in NHIndustries joint venture)	Military utility	Twin		2006	10.6 (23,000)
Tiger	Military attack	Twin		2003	6.6 (15,000)

=== Projects ===
- X^{3} rotorcraft – hybrid helicopter with two forward propellers, which achieved a 255-knot speed milestone in level flight in June 2011.
- Airbus Helicopters X6 – Two year concept study into the possible launch of an 11.5t helicopter to replace the H225.
- Airbus RACER, experimental high-speed compound helicopter developed from the X^{3}, targeting a 2020 first flight.
- Airbus CityAirbus, electrically powered VTOL aircraft demonstrator, intended for an air taxi role.

== See also ==
Comparable major helicopter manufacturers:

- AgustaWestland — formerly Agusta and Westland Helicopters
- Bell Textron — formerly Bell Helicopter
- Boeing Rotorcraft Systems — formerly Boeing Helicopters and Boeing Vertol
- Leonardo S.p.A. — formerly Leonardo-Finmeccanica
- MD Helicopters — formerly McDonnell Douglas Helicopter Systems
- Russian Helicopters
- Sikorsky Aircraft — (Lockheed Martin subsidy)
- Westland Helicopters — (merged with Agusta)
