= Russian Helicopters =

Russian helicopter manufacturer

JSC Russian Helicopters
- Type: Joint-stock company
- Industry: Aerospace
- Founded: 2007; 19 years ago
- Headquarters: Moscow, Russia
- Area served: Worldwide
- Key people: Nikolay Kolesov (CEO); Vladimir Artyakov (Chairman)
- Products: Civilian and military Helicopters
- Revenue: 1,810,000,000 United States dollar (2018)
- Operating income: $483 million (2016)
- Net income: $242 million (2016)
- Total assets: $5.49 billion (2016)
- Total equity: $1.77 billion (2016)
- Number of employees: 46,000
- Parent: Rostec
- Divisions: see structure
- Website: rhc.ru/en

JSC Russian Helicopters (Russian: Вертолёты России, romanized: Vertolyoty Rossii, lit. 'Vertol of Russia') is a Russian helicopter manufacturing holding company that unites the majority of Russian helicopter manufacturing enterprises. The company's principal shareholder is Rostec. The holding company includes production plants producing finished products and design bureaus.

JSC Russian Helicopters produces light, medium, medium-heavy and heavy helicopters for military and civilian use. In 2019, the company held a 9.54% share of the military helicopter market and a 1.66% share of the civilian helicopter market.

== History ==
The Russian Helicopters holding company was established in 2006 as a subsidiary of OJSC OPC Oboronprom, to which the parent company's helicopter manufacturing assets were transferred.

In 2007, Russian Helicopters consolidated all components of helicopter production and maintenance: helicopter development – Mil, Kamov, and Kazan Helicopter Plant design bureaus; helicopter serial production enterprises – Kazan Helicopter Plant, Ulan-Ude Aviation Plant, Rostvertol (Heavy Helicopter Plant); component manufacturers: Stupino Engineering Production Enterprise, Vpered (Moscow Machine-Building Plant); R.E.T. Kronstadt (Helicopter Simulator Production); helicopter repair - Novosibirsk Aircraft Repair Plant; service and marketing companies - Helicopter Service Company (created on the basis of OJSC Kamov-Holding), airline Aero-Kamov.

In September 2009, EASA, the European agency responsible for overseeing compliance with civil aviation safety standards in European countries, certified the Ka-32A11BC helicopter, allowing it to operate in European Union airspace. The helicopter's EASA.IM.R.133 type certificate allows EU operators to legally use the Russian aircraft for commercial purposes.

By the end of 2010, the holding company had consolidated controlling stakes in all helicopter manufacturing plants in Russia.

The company attempted to stage an IPO on the London Stock Exchange in May 2011, raising approximately $500 million (including up to $250 million in investment in the company itself, with the remainder going to its owner, Oboronprom). On the eve of the IPO, the company was valued at $1.8–2.4 billion. The lead-up to the IPO was accompanied by a rather high-profile advertising campaign, wish included a congratulatory advertisement in The Times on the occasion of Prince William's wedding. The full-page ad depicted an Mil Mi-26T helicopter hovering over Buckingham Palace with a large gift package. The ad was accompanied by the slogan, "For a famous pilot from a famous helicopter manufacturer." However, the IPO was postponed due to low demand for the shares.

In 2011, Russian Helicopters completed the placement of Series BO-02 exchange-traded bonds worth 5 billion rubles. Gazprombank served as the issue manager.

In 2011 Russian Helicopters and the Italian company AgustaWestland agreed to establish HeliVert, a joint company, in order to start production in Russia of the AW139 twin-engine multipurpose helicopter. The production plant is located in Tomilino, Moscow Region, on the premises of the National Helicopter Manufacturing Center. The first flight of the Russian-assembled AW139 took place in December 2012. As of June 2014, the joint venture had produced only two VIP helicopters, with seven more in the assembly line. In 2012, at the Farnborough Airshow, the parties signed a framework agreement to develop a single-engine, light helicopter weighing 2.5 tons. Serial production was scheduled to begin in 2015 and was expected to be a 50/50 partnership. However, in March 2014, the joint project was terminated. The parties cited the impossibility of creating a commercially viable product in this market segment.

In its annual Defense News TOP 100 ranking of defense industry companies worldwide, the industry publication Defense News placed Russian Helicopters in 24th place for 2012, noting the record growth rate of the Russian defense company, which rose from 39th place in the ranking for 2011. The rating analysis notes that during the reporting period, the Russian defense industry as a whole demonstrated impressive results, especially against the backdrop of declining military spending by the United States and several European countries.

At the air show MAKS-2015, the company presented a mobile service center for servicing and routine repairs of civilian and military aircraft. That same year, the company delivered nine Ka-32A11BC helicopters to China for local public security departments and commercial companies.

In 2016 the company delivered 189 aircraft to customers in 13 countries. In the same year, it ended a partnership with the Ukraine-based engine maker Motor Sich.

In 2017 the Russian Direct Investment Fund (RDIF) formed a consortium comprising leading Middle Eastern funds and finalized a deal to acquire a minority stake in Russian Helicopters (part of the Rostec). Russian Helicopters valuation was estimated at $2.35 billion. No details have been revealed about the identity of the Middle Eastern investors.

The transaction consists of two stages. The first stage involves the sale of a 12% stake and an investment of $300 million, as well as an agreed-upon subsequent potential increase in investment to $600 million. The deal will increase the authorized capital of the holding company. This will accumulate a significant amount of funds within the company. These funds are necessary for the implementation of the company's strategy and business plan, including the development of new types of helicopters. In addition, these funds will help implement the investment program of the holding company, as well as finance possible M&A activities aimed at increasing the holding's value and finance capital programs.

In 2018, the company's revenue in Russia amounted to 36 billion rubles.

At the end of 2019, the company's share of the external market in the military helicopter segment amounted to 9.54% (the figure decreased by 2.66% from 2017), and in the civilian helicopter segment – 1.66% (the figure increased from 0.95% in 2017).

== Activity ==
Russian Helicopters Holding Company develops and manufactures helicopters and unmanned aerial vehicles, provides repairs, service, and marketing services for helicopters.

The holding company includes two helicopter manufacturing schools: Kamov Design Bureau and Mil Moscow Helicopter Plant. Its main production facilities are Kazan Helicopters, Ulan-Ude Aviation Plant, Kumertau Aviation Production Enterprise, Rostvertol and Progress Arsenyev Aviation Company, as well as component manufacturers: Stupino Engineering Production Enterprise and Reductor-PM.

The company's products are supplied to China, Spain, Kazakhstan, Belarus, Serbia, Algeria, Iraq, Angola, Nigeria, Uganda, Zimbabwe, Brazil, Venezuela, Colombia, South Korea, Egypt, Sri Lanka, India. Ka-32 helicopters are used for firefighting in European countries. As of 2010, South Korea purchased approximately 70 Ka-32 helicopters and was one of the main buyers of this model.

In April 2018, Russian Helicopters unveiled the VRT300 unmanned aerial vehicle (UAV) for the first time, with a maximum takeoff weight of 300 kg and a target payload of 70 kg. Two prototypes were created: the Arctic Supervision, with a side-looking radar for ice reconnaissance (determining ice thickness), and the Opticvision, with an extended flight range for monitoring and remote sensing of the earth. Arctic Supervision was developed for integration into the Northern Sea Route transport system, while Opticvision is primarily intended for diagnostics, prevention, and emergency response during hydrocarbon production and transportation, as well as for diagnostics of overhead power lines, mapping, cargo transportation, search operations, etc. It can stay in the air for up to 5 hours.

In April 2019, Russian Helicopters developed a preliminary design for a "synchrocopter" with two main rotors and one pusher rotor. The design is based on a synchro-rotor helicopter and will be capable of reaching a maximum speed of 420 km/h.

In July 2021, at the Moscow Aviation and Space Salon (MAKS-2021), Russian Helicopters presented the BAS-200 unmanned helicopter. The aircraft has a maximum takeoff weight of 200 kg, a mobile control center mounted on a light vehicle trailer, and can remain airborne for up to 4 hours. The drone can be used for terrain monitoring and for delivering cargo weighing up to 50 kg. At the same Moscow Aviation and Space Salon, Russian Helicopters signed an agreement with Russian Post for the use of the BAS-200 and VRT300 unmanned aerial vehicles in the Chukotka Autonomous Okrug.

In 2020 the UAE acquired a 50% stake in VR Technologies to develop the VRT500 and VRT300. In November 2023 the UAE split with Russian Helicopters to continue the development independently and avoid sanction issues. An Abu Dhabi fund also announced it was ending its partnership with Russian Helicopters over sanction issues, to develop the VRT500 and VRT300.

On November 16, 2021, Russian Helicopters and the Emirati company AJ Holding LLC founded a joint venture, Alpha Aviation LLC, in the Ajman Free Zone, which will promote and sell Russian civilian helicopters abroad.

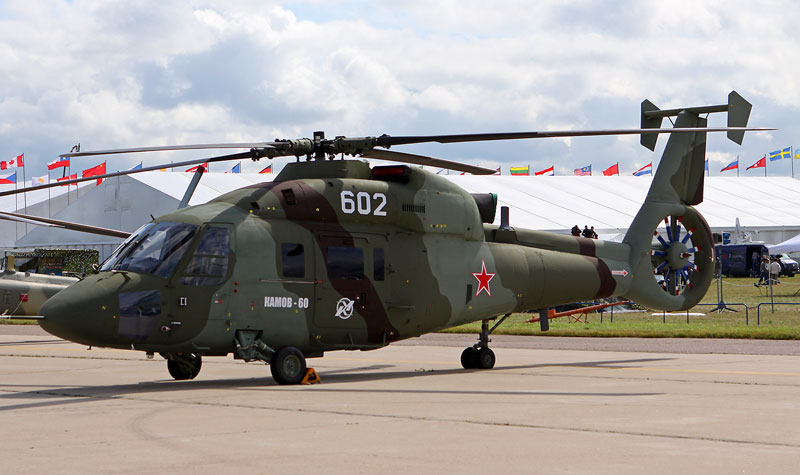
Kamov Ka-60

In 2021, there was a decrease in Mi-8/17 deliveries, due to the fact that its price was inflated by 3-4 times. In 2007, the most expensive helicopter in this series cost about $6 million, a regular helicopter - $4.5-5.3 million. In 2021, the cost of a helicopter reached $15-18 million.

== Products ==
=== Helicopters in serial production ===
==== Commercial ====
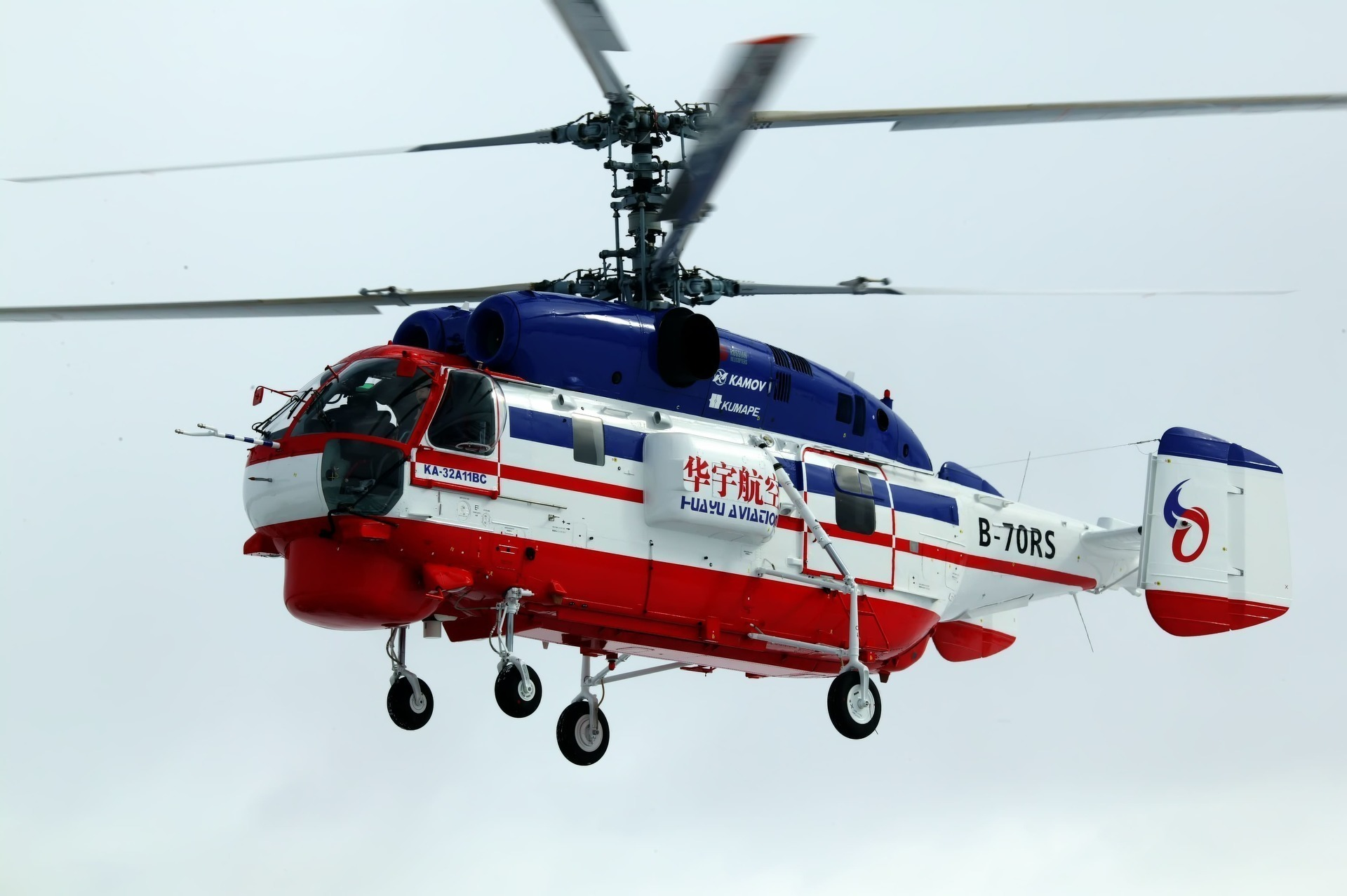
Kamov Ka-32 — heavy-duty transport helicopter

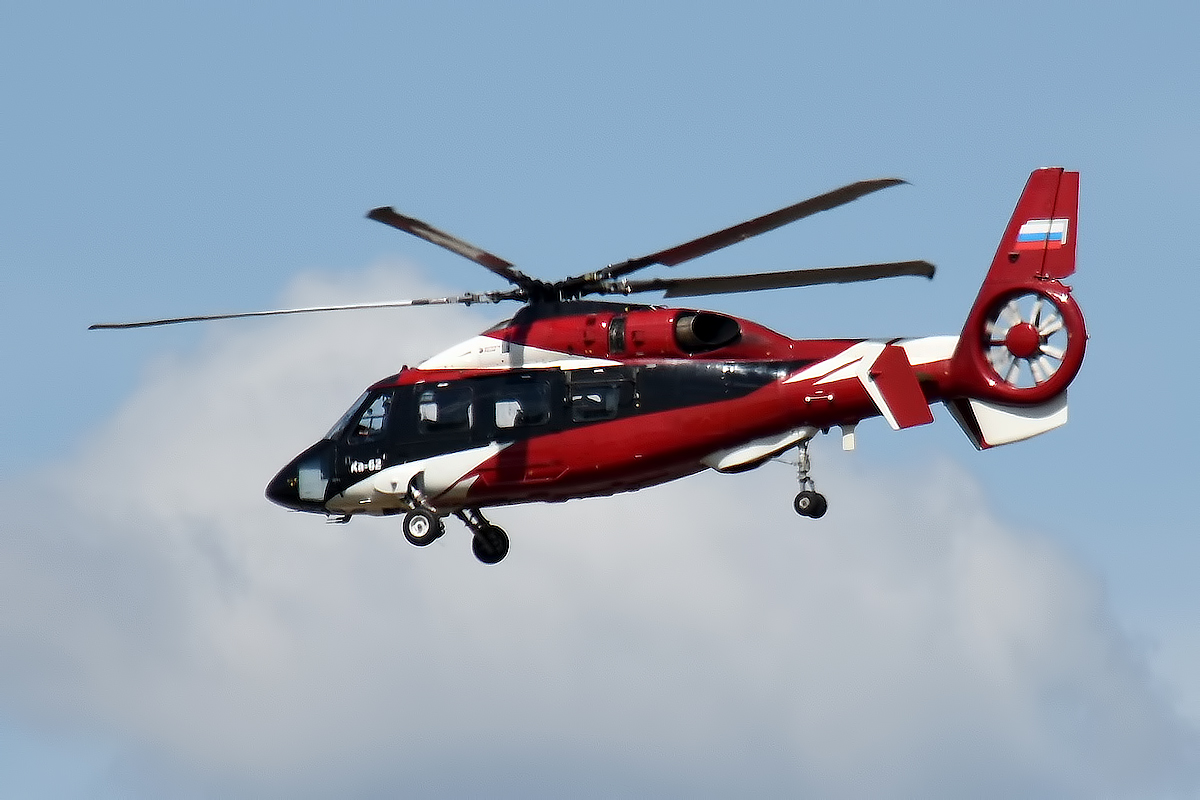
Kamov Ka-62 — medium twin-turbine military transport helicopter

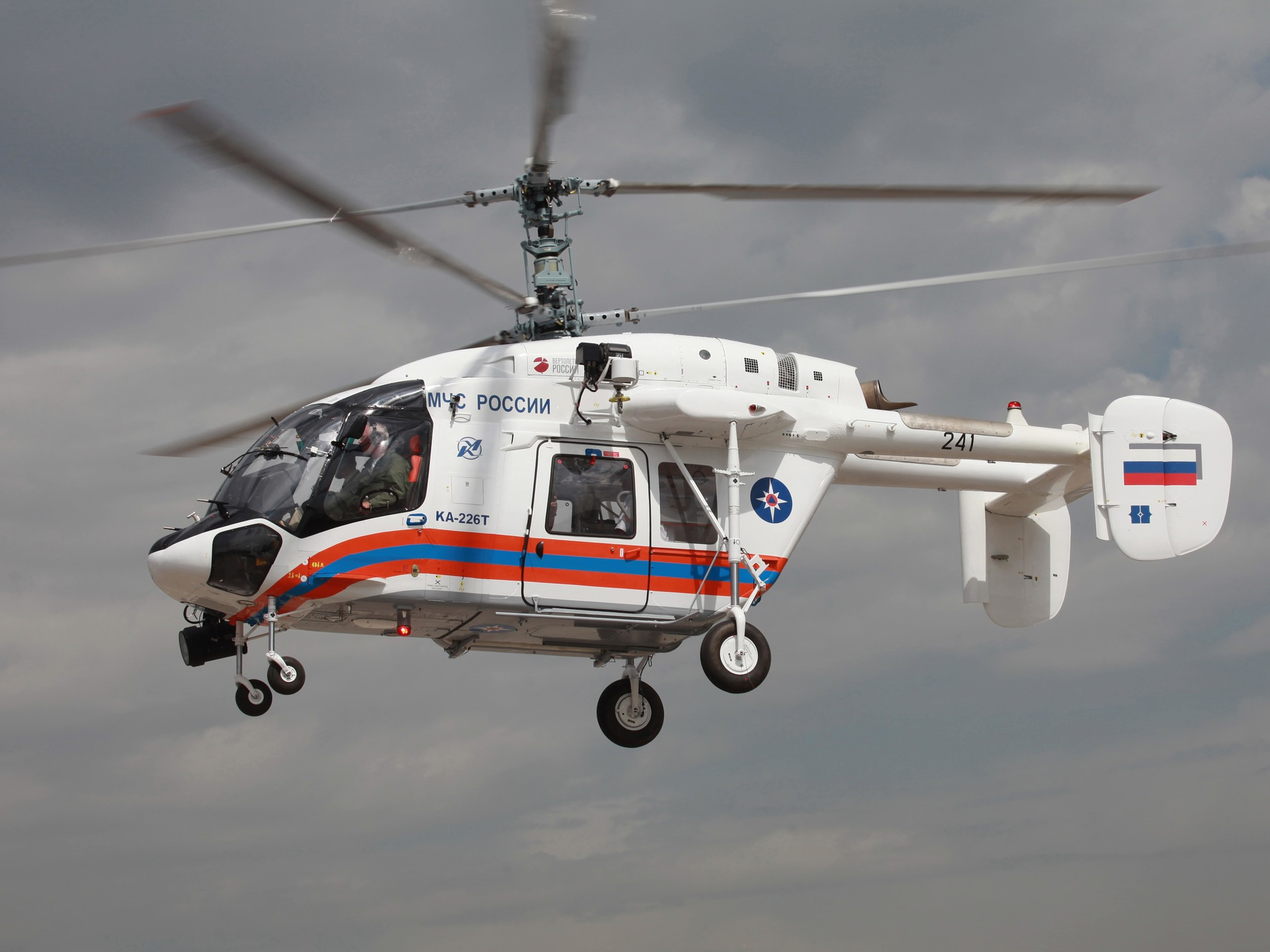
Kamov Ka-226 — light multi-role helicopter

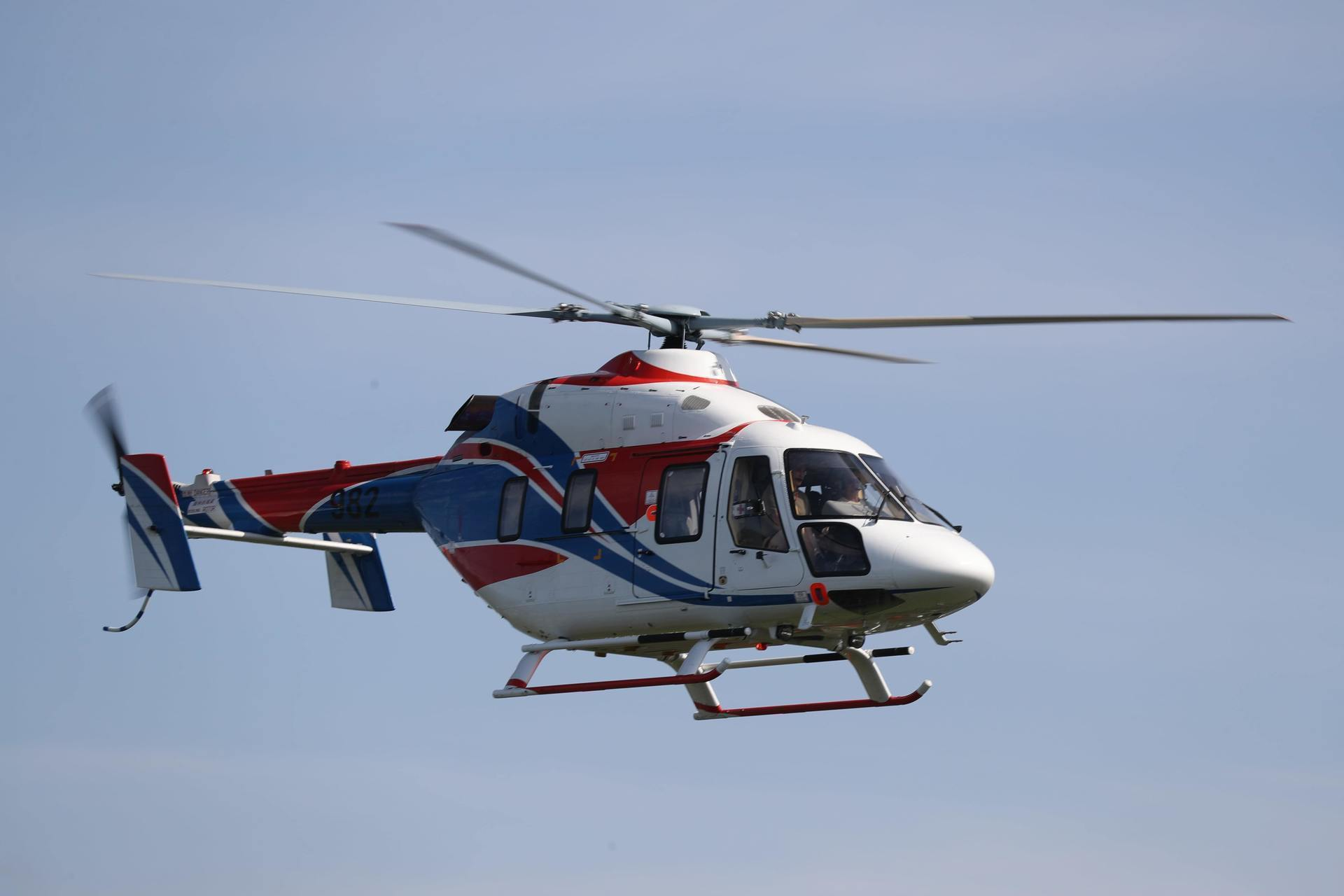
Kazan Ansat — light multi-role helicopter

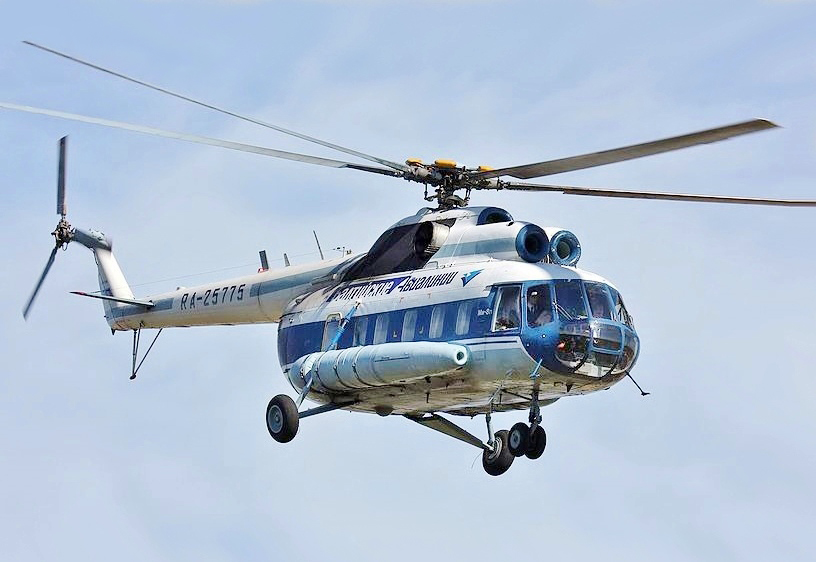
Mil Mi-8 — medium twin-turbine helicopter

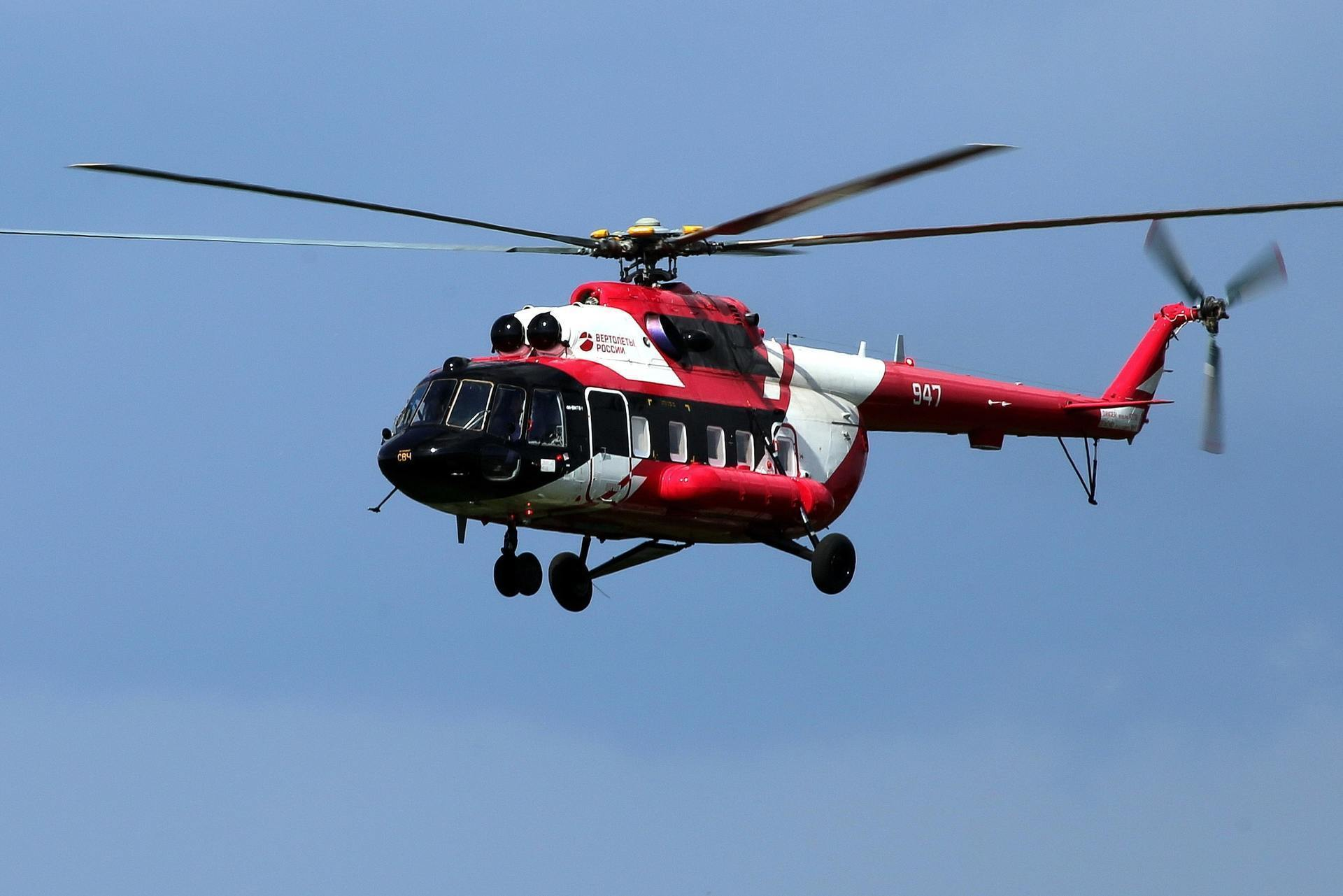
Mil Mi-17 — medium multi-role helicopter

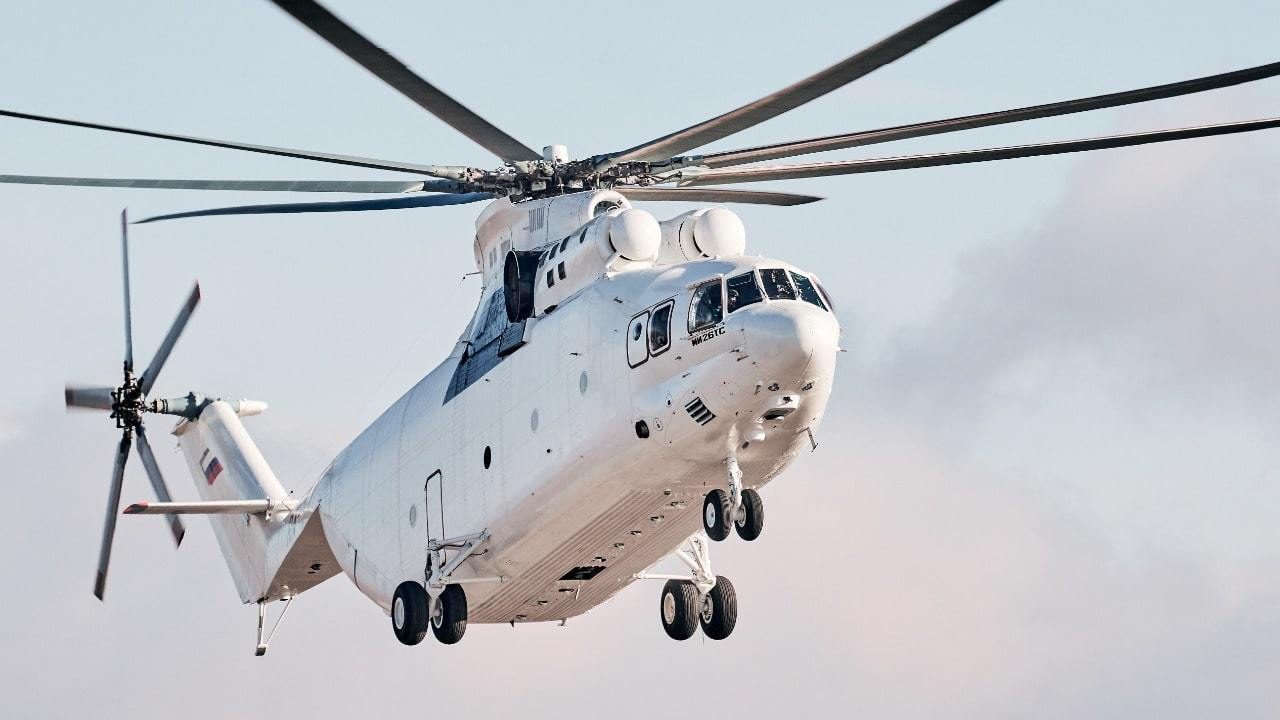
Mil Mi-26 — heavy multi-role transport helicopter

==== Military ====
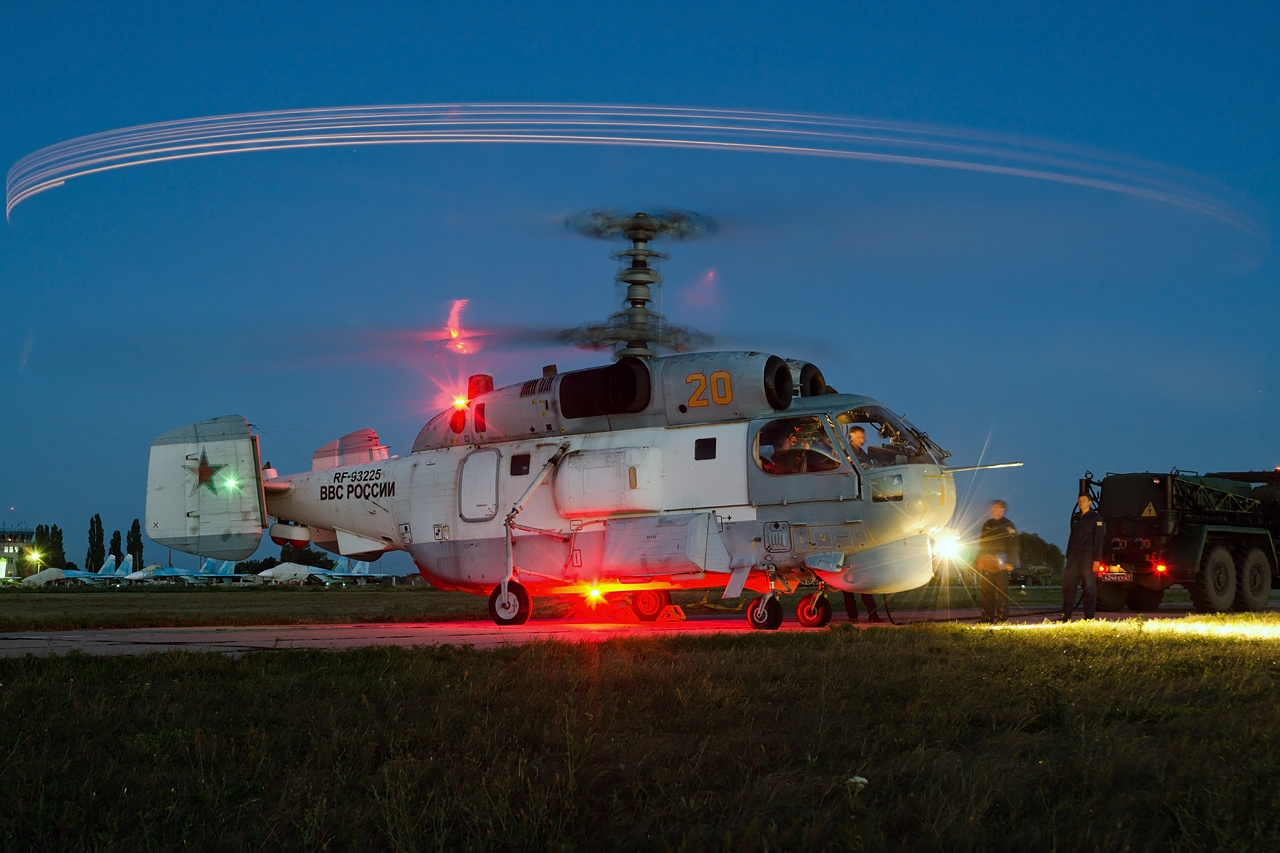
Kamov Ka-27 — shipborne anti-submarine helicopter

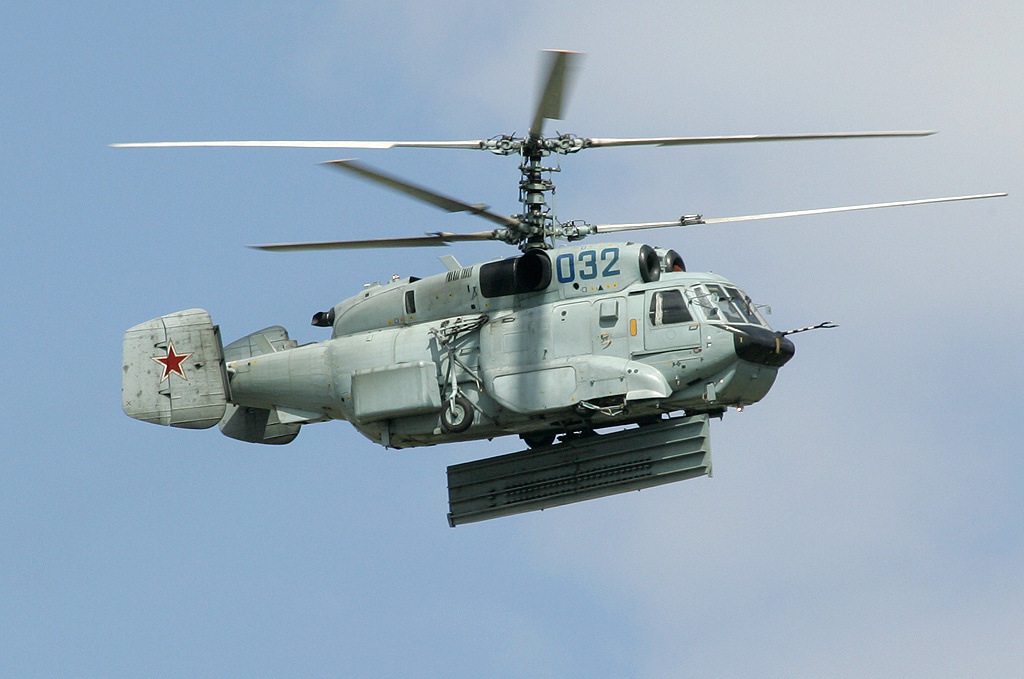
Kamov Ka-31 — radar picket helicopter

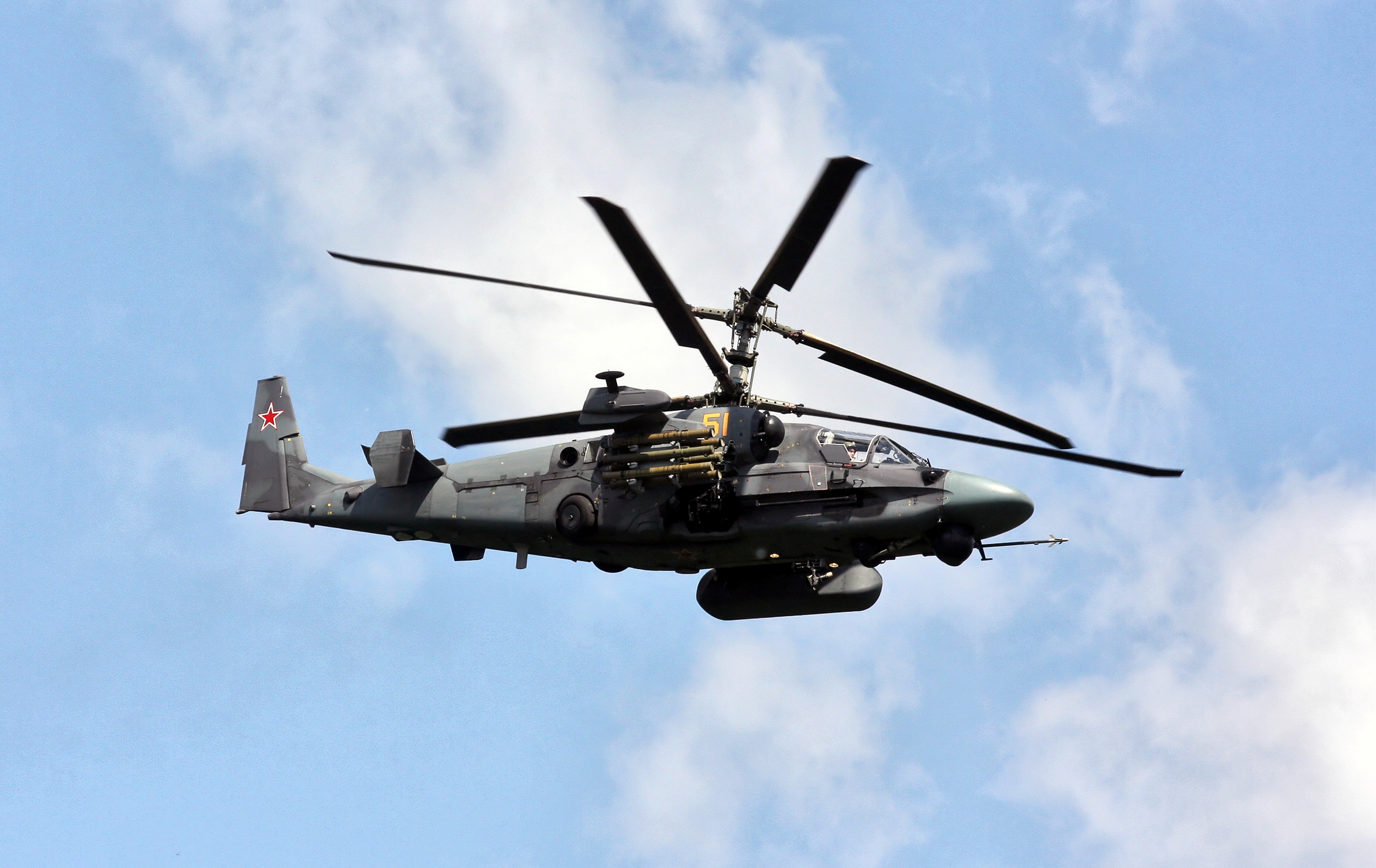
Kamov Ka-52 — reconnaissance and attack helicopter

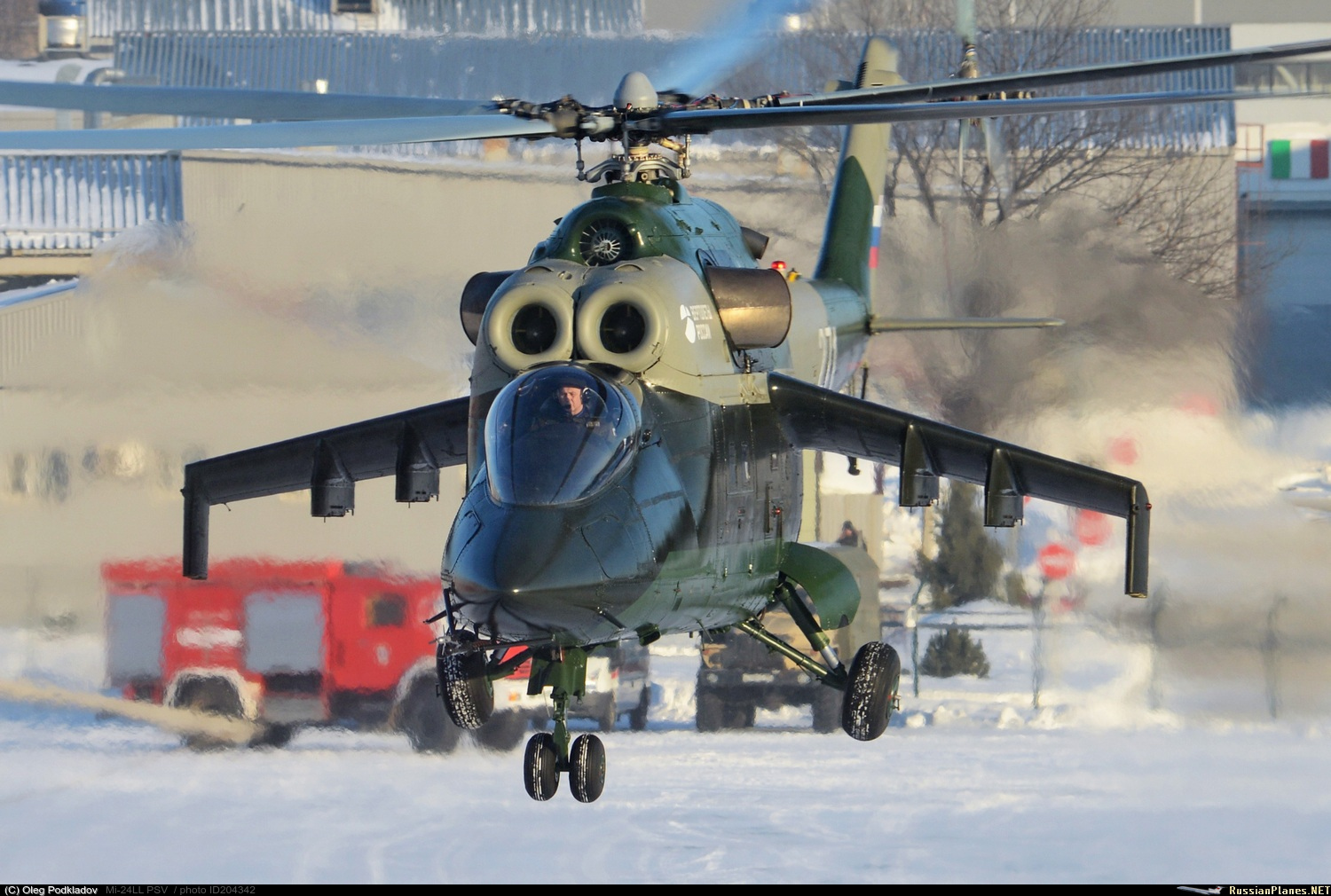
Mil Mi-24 — combat attack helicopter

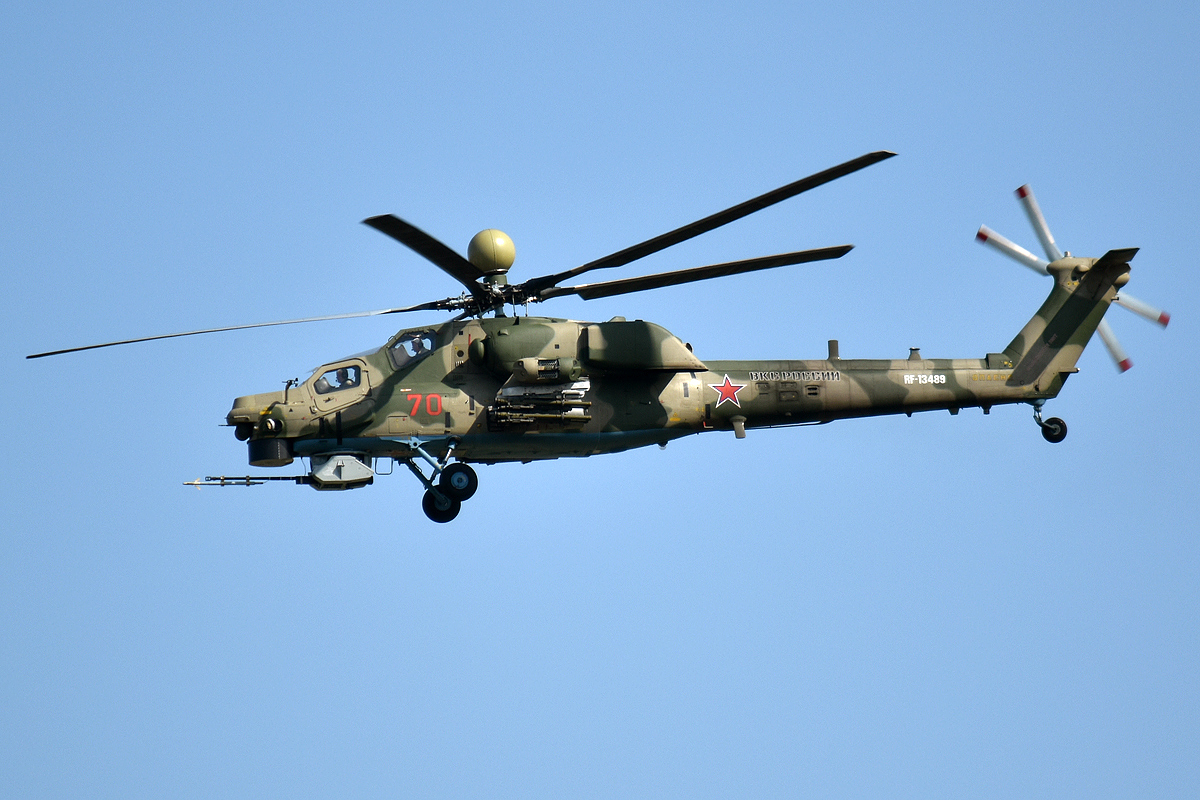
Mil Mi-28 — combat attack helicopter

=== Helicopters currently in the R&D or technical proposal phase ===
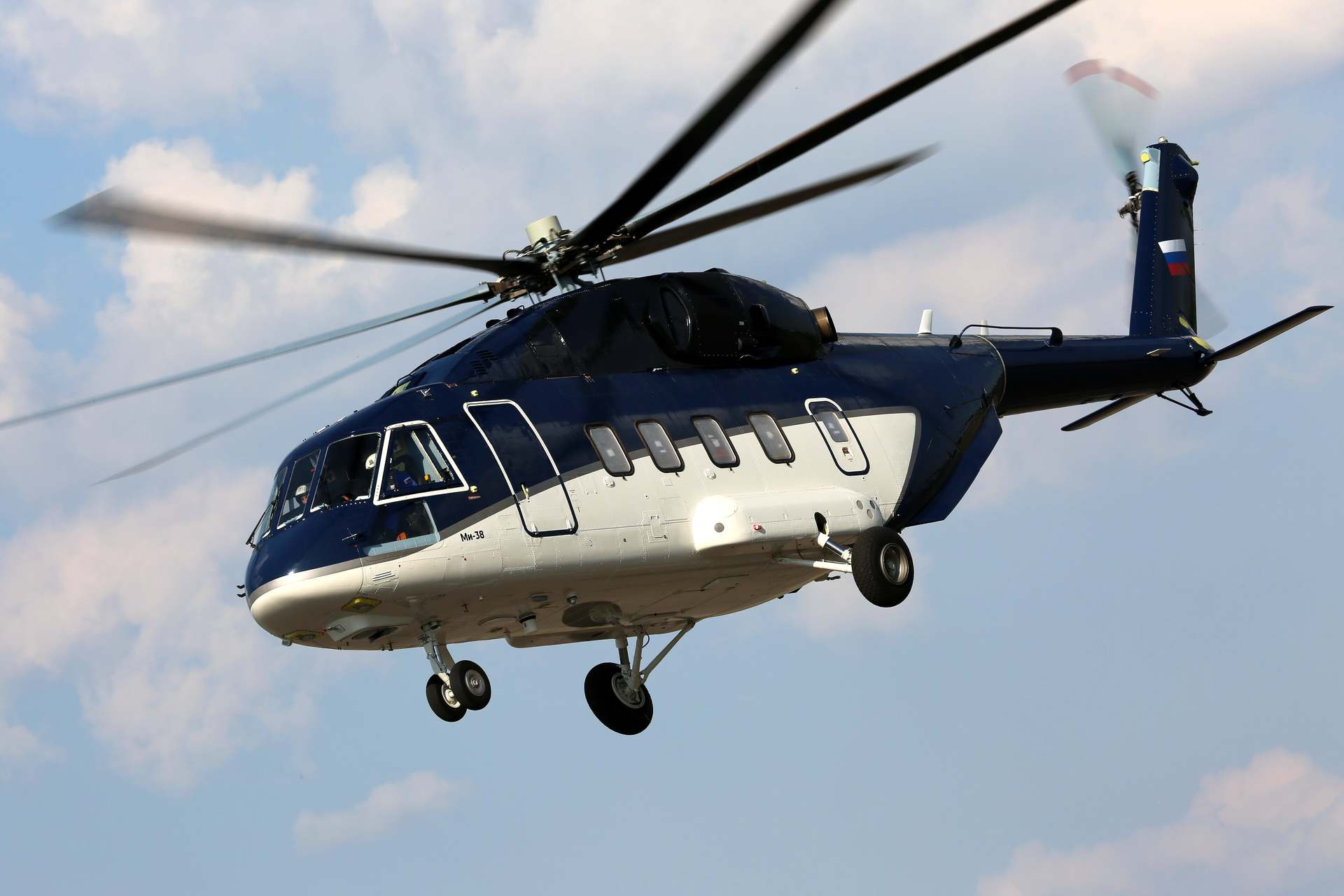
Mil Mi-38 — medium multi-role helicopter

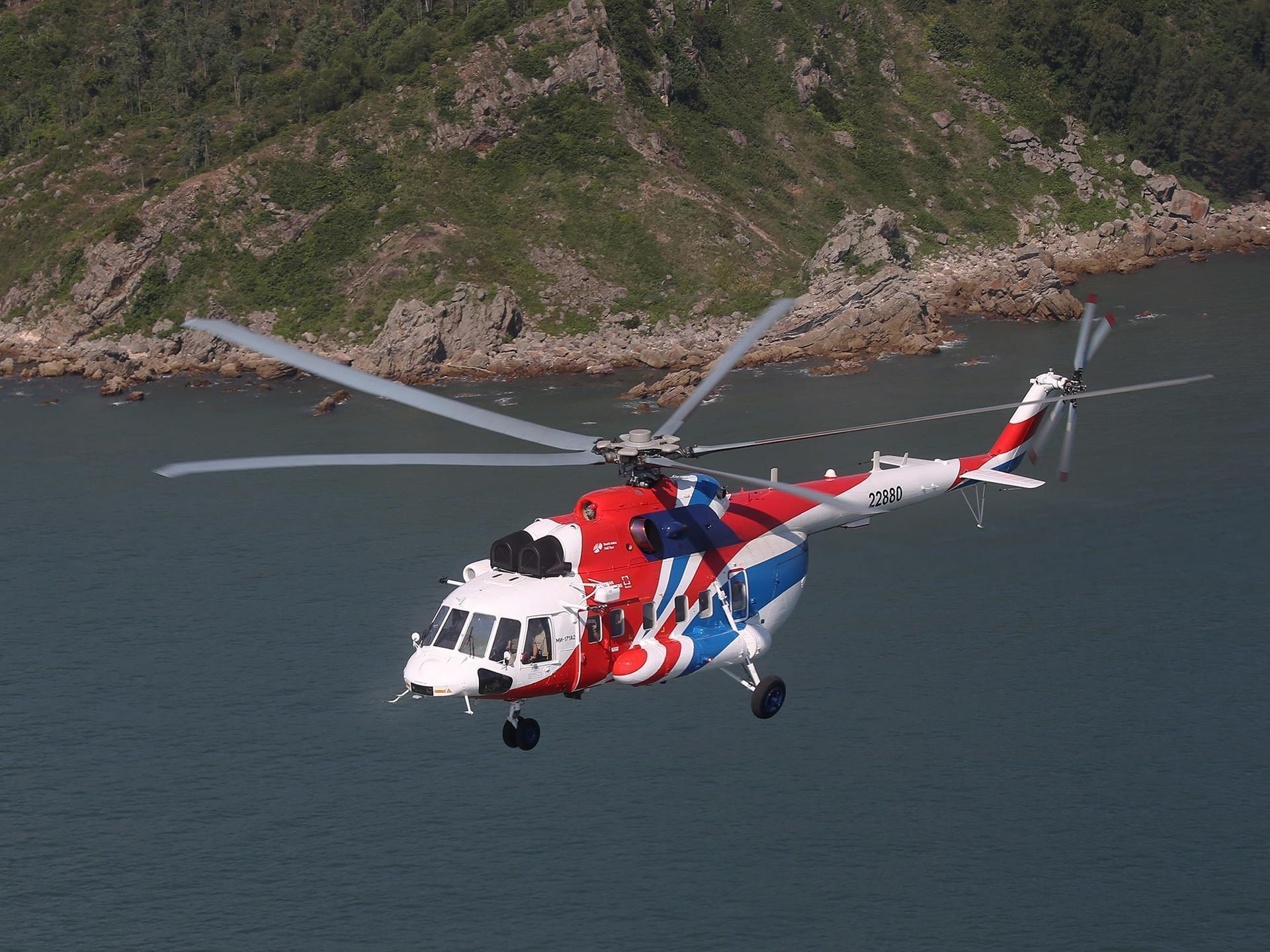
Mil Mi-171 — medium transport helicopter

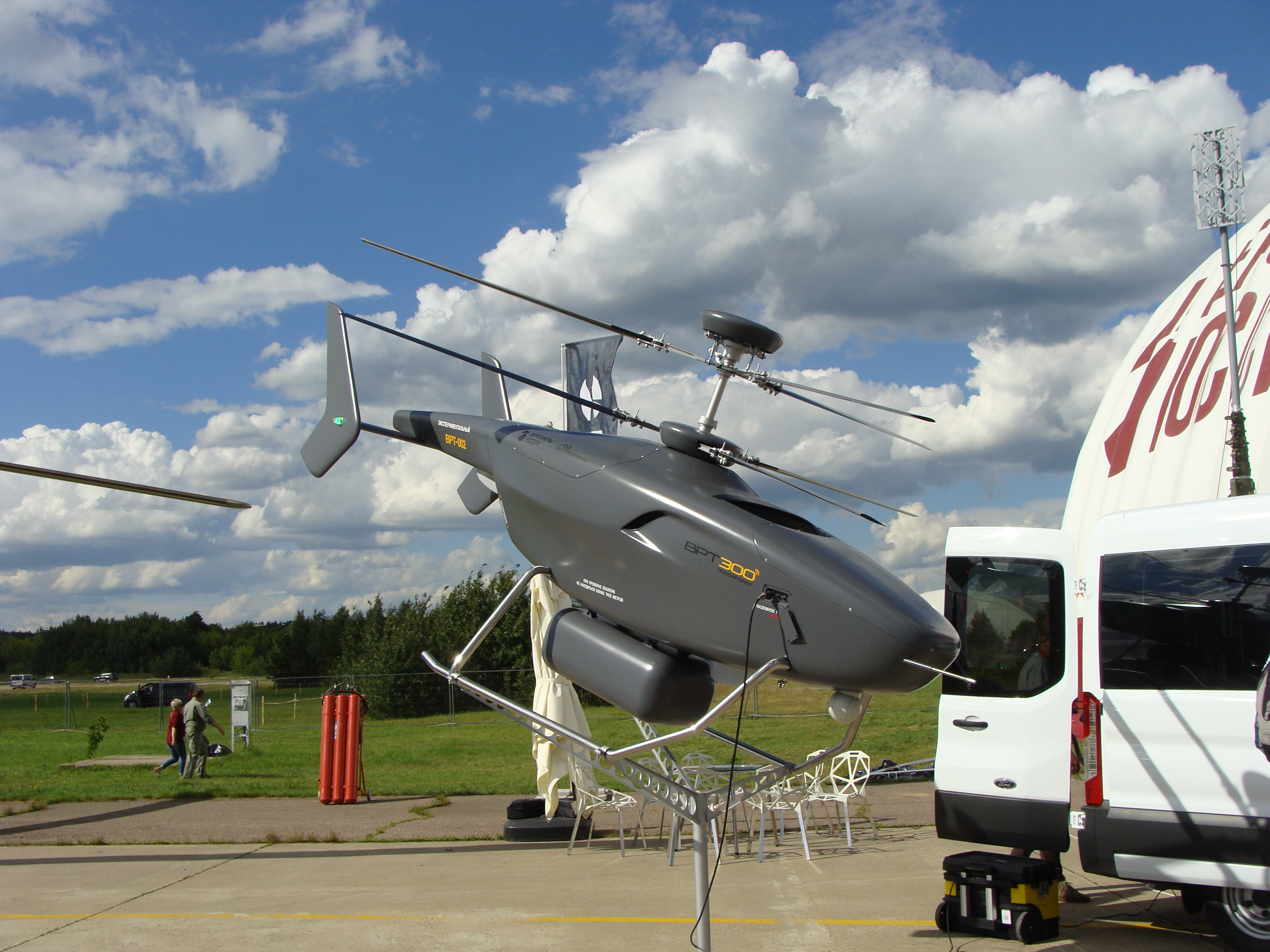
VRT 300 - unmanned helicopter

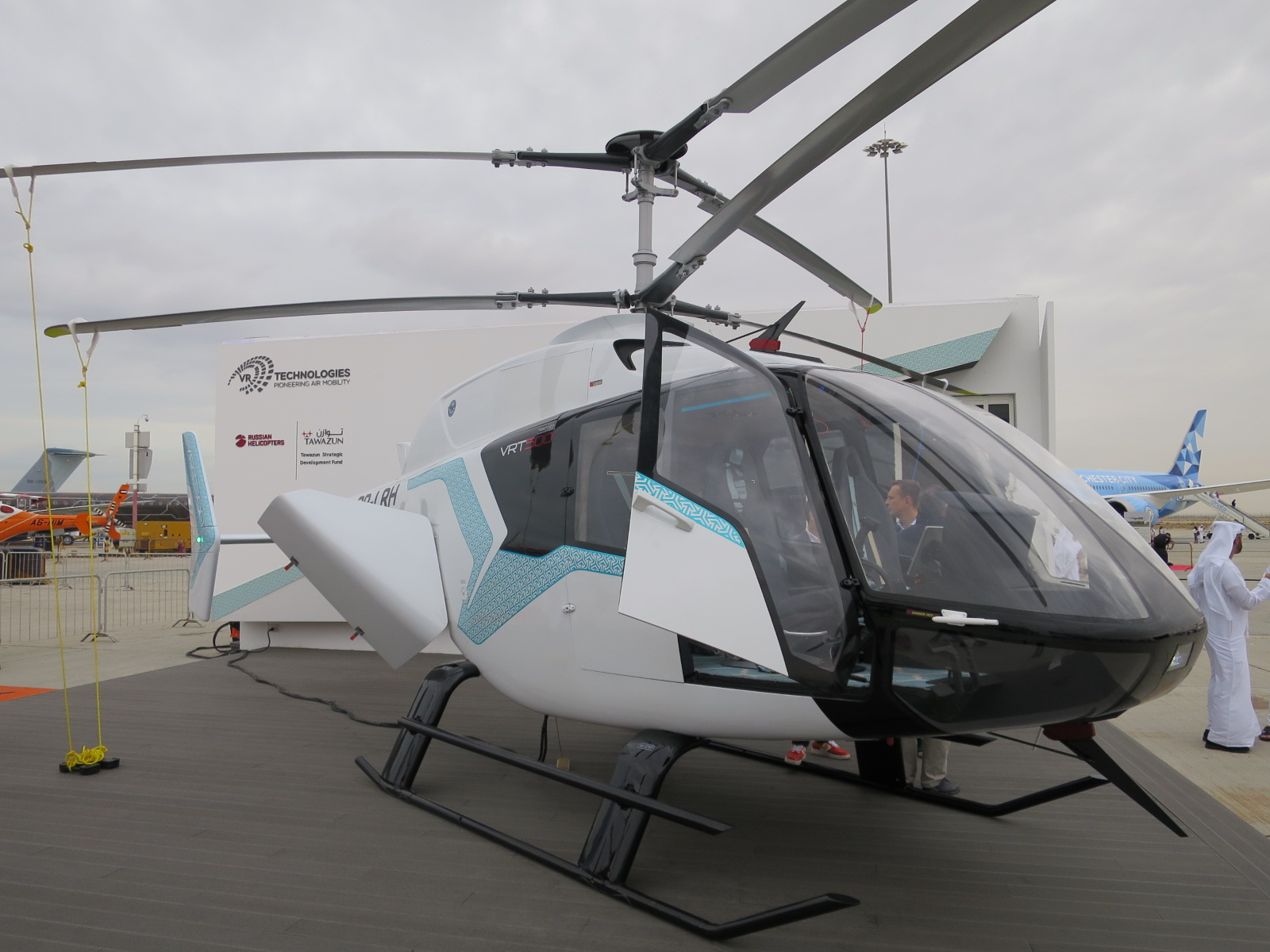
VRT 500 — light helicopter

=== Minoga naval helicopter project ===
In 2006 the Russian defense ministry awarded Russian Helicopters a R&D contract for a naval helicopter conducting antisubmarine warfare among other tasks, following the coaxials Kamov Ka-15, Ka-25, and Ka-27. The resulting Minoga (Russian: Минога, lit. 'lamprey') project has been wind-tunnel tested since, the Russian Navy will inspect a mockup in early 2019 and its maiden flight is planned after 2020. It may be coaxial and could be based on the early 2000s Ka-92 concept competing with the Mil Mi-X1 for a high-speed civilian helicopter halted in 2015.

Powered by two 380 kg (772 lb) Klimov TV7-117V turboshafts developing 3,500-3,750 hp in emergencies, 2,500-3,000 at maximum takeoff weight, and 1,650 hp in cruise; they are interchangeable with their VK-2500 predecessor, indicating a larger rotorcraft than in 2015, powered by NPO Saturn RD-600V. It has to be compact enough to store two in a ship hangar housing a single 12 tons Ka-27: Kamov studied a lightweight deck helicopters from four-five to seven-eight metric tons. The Kamov Ka-52K Katran is in flight tests but is limited to electronic reconnaissance and airstrike.

== Helicopter production indicators ==
In 2007, Russian Helicopters manufactured and delivered 121 helicopters to customers.

In 2008, the company manufactured and delivered 169 helicopters to customers.

In 2009, the holding's enterprises manufactured 183 helicopters of various modifications.

In 2010, 214 helicopters were manufactured.

In 2011, 262 helicopters were delivered to customers.

In 2012, 290 helicopters were built at the helicopter manufacturing enterprises that are part of the holding.

In 2013, 303 helicopters were produced, 130 units were delivered to foreign customers.

In 2014, Russian Helicopters delivered 271 helicopters to customers.

In 2015, helicopter production decreased by 21%, with a total of 212 military and civilian helicopters produced.

In 2016, the number of helicopters produced decreased by 10.8%, with 189 helicopters produced.

In 2017, 205 helicopters were built, and 148 helicopters underwent major repairs.

In 2018, Russian Helicopters produced approximately 200 aircraft.

In 2019, the company produced and delivered 153 new helicopters and completed major repairs on 124 helicopters.

In 2020, 128 helicopters were produced, 141 helicopters were delivered to customers.

In 2021, 185 helicopters were produced.

In 2022, the holding's enterprises produced 296 helicopters.

In 2023, the holding's enterprises built 311 helicopters.

== Senior leadership ==
Nikolay Aleksandrovich Kolesov - General Director since November 2021.

Andrey Ivanovich Boginsky - General Director from January 2017 to November 2021.

Aleksander Alexandrovich Mikheyev - General Director from September 2013 to January 2017.

Dmitry Evgenievich Petrov - General Director from September 2010 to September 2013.

== Sponsored projects ==
In 2012, Russian Helicopters began a partnership with the British company Caterham Group, which owns Caterham Cars brand and Caterham F1 Formula 1 team. During this collaboration, the parties have implemented numerous mutually beneficial ideas, including a program to promote motorsports in Russia and joint international marketing projects involving Russian-made helicopters and real Caterham F1 racing cars. The companies also attach significant importance to their collaboration in the technological field. This provides the basis for new joint programs in the field of composite materials and high technology. In 2012, Russian Helicopters was the official partner of the Caterham F1 Formula 1 team.

Since 2013, the holding has sponsored the title road cycling team Russian Helicopters, which includes many young Russian cyclists.

In April 2014, Russian Helicopters became the official sponsor of the Russian professional football club PFC CSKA Moscow.

== See also ==
Comparable major helicopter manufacturers:

- AgustaWestland
- Airbus Helicopters
- Bell Helicopter
- Boeing Rotorcraft Systems
- MD Helicopters
- Sikorsky Aircraft
