= Ulan-Ude Aviation Plant =

Russian joint-stock company specializing in aircraft manufacturing

Coordinates: 51.85793434971064°N 107.73771906893894°E

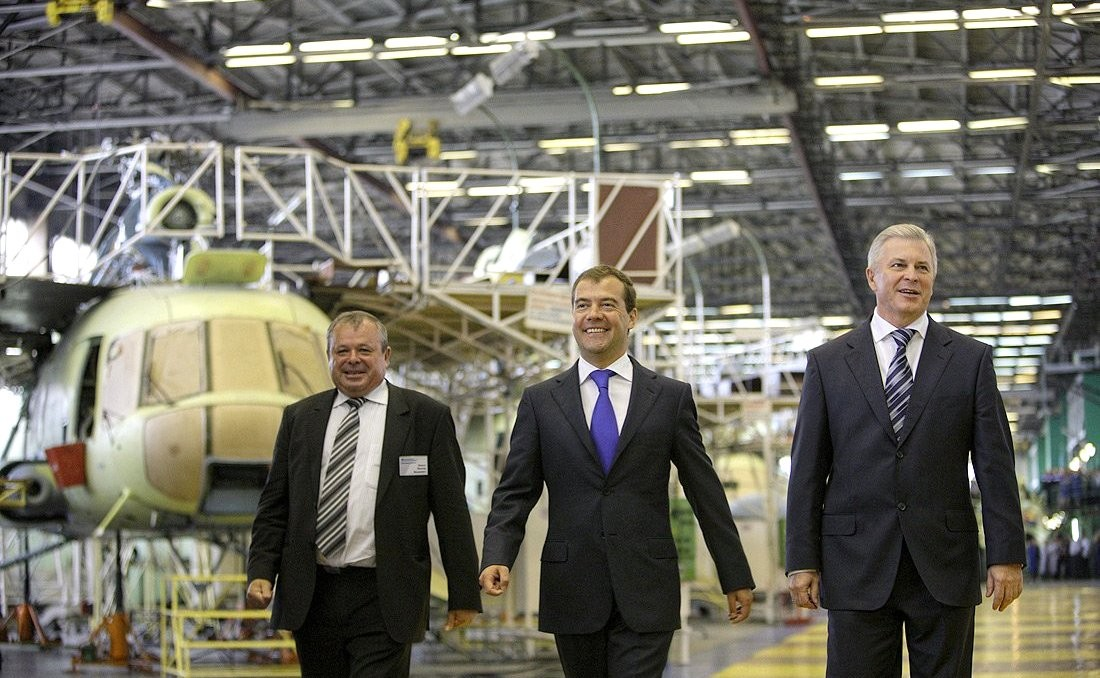
- Russian president Dmitry Medvedev visiting the Ulan-Ude Aviation Plant in Buryatia August 2009
- Industry: Aviation
- Founded: 1939; 87 years ago
- Headquarters: Ulan-Ude, Republic of Buryatia
- Products: Aircraft
- Revenue: $394 million (2017)
- Operating income: $46 million (2017)
- Net income: $40.6 million (2017)
- Total assets: $1.07 billion (2017)
- Total equity: $681 million (2017)
- Parent: Russian Helicopters

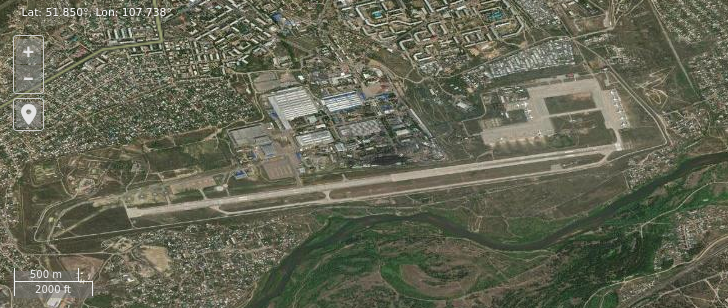
Satellite imagery of Ulan-Ude Aviation Plant North of Ulan-Ude Vostochny Airport

Ulan-Ude Aviation Plant (UUAP) (Note: Russian: Улан-Удэнский авиационный завод (УУАЗ), romanized: Ulán-Udénskiy aviaciónnyy zavód (UUAZ); Buryat: Улаан-Үдын авиационно завод (УУАЗ), romanized: Ulaan-Udiin aviacionno zavod (UUAZ)) is a Russian joint-stock company specializing in aircraft manufacturing. It is based in Ulan-Ude, Buryatia.

== History ==
The company was founded in 1939 for repair services of I-16 fighters and SB bombers. During World War II, it produced La-5 and La-7 fighter airplanes. In 1956, the factory stepped into the epoch of helicopter production. A considerable part of the factory's history is devoted to manufacture of the most selling Mi-8 helicopter, started in 1970. The factory has produced over 4000 Mi-8 helicopters altogether.

In 2008, the company was given the annual "Russia's best exporter of the year" award by Ministry of Economic Development and Trade of Russian Federation.

== Production ==
As of 2009 its main products include Mi-8Т, Mi-171, Мi-171Sh helicopters. The company also produces household items.

== Ownership ==
Major shareholders in 2009:

- Rostec 75.09%
- DCC 12.56%
- Leader IPF Gasfund 5.25%
- Other 7.10%

== Awards ==
The plant was awarded the Order of the Red Banner of Labour.

The plant was awarded the gratitude of Russian president Vladimir Putin for his great contribution to the implementation of the state defense order.

The plant received the "Pride of the Fatherland" prize, which marked the Mi-171 helicopter in the "100 best goods of Russia" competition.

== Notable people ==
Viktor Yashin, a Hero of the Soviet Union and pilot, worked at the plant from 1949 to 1952.

Between 1998 and 2000, the position of Deputy General Director of the Ulan-Ude Aviation Plant was held by Denis Manturov. Since 2012, he has been serving as Minister of Industry and Trade of the Russian Federation.
