= 2015 Belgrade helicopter crash =

Aviation incident in Serbia

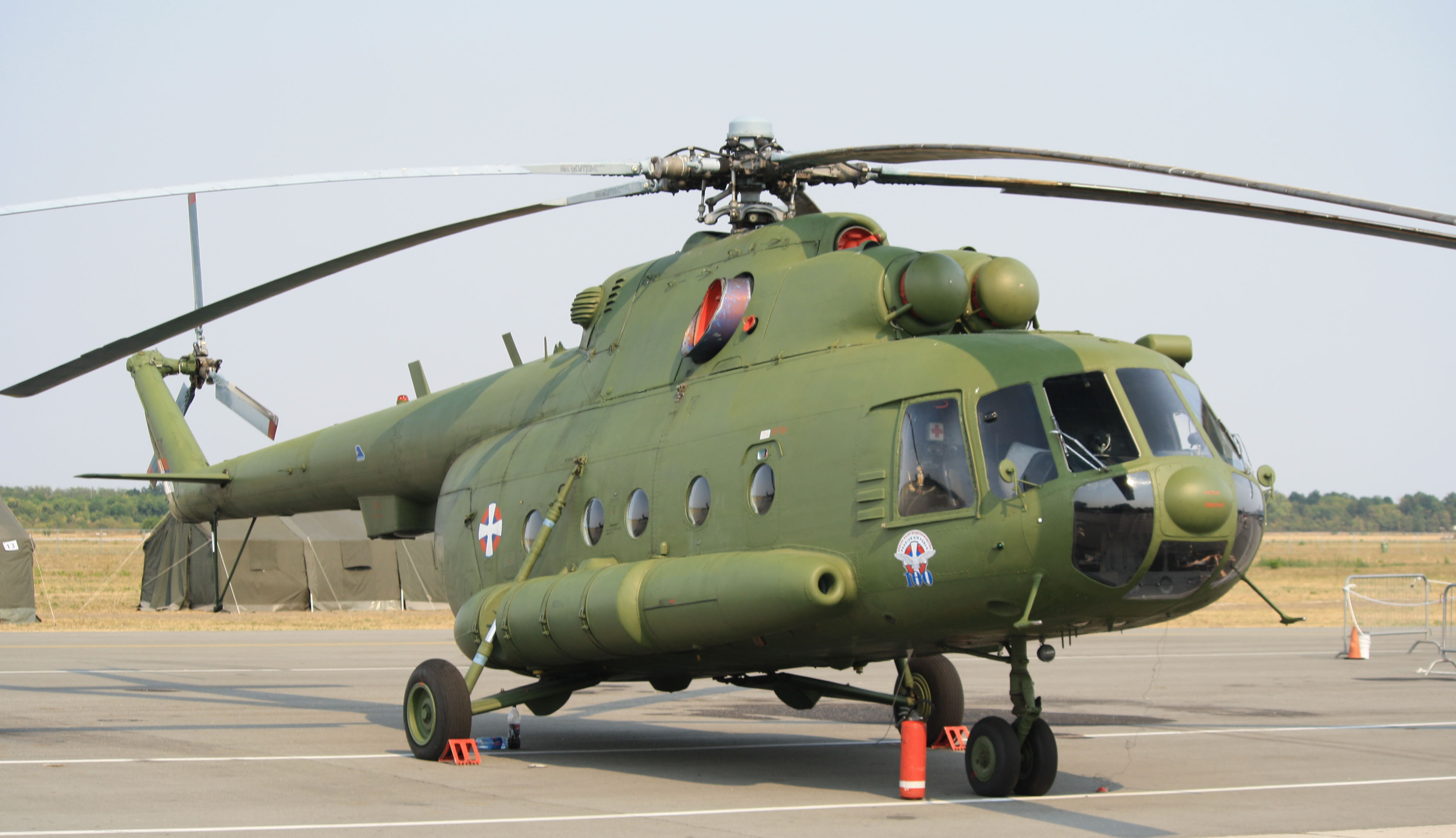
- The helicopter involved in the crash, photographed in 2012

Crash
- Date: 13 March 2015
- Summary: Helicopter crashed due to low visibility
- Site: Surčin, Serbia
- Total fatalities: 7

Aircraft
- Aircraft type: Mil Mi-17
- Operator: Serbian Army
- Registration: 12551
- Flight origin: Novi Pazar
- Stopover: Raška
- Destination: Belgrade Nikola Tesla Airport
- Occupants: 7
- Crew: 4
- Fatalities: 7
- Survivors: 0

On 13 March 2015, a Serbian Army Mil Mi-17 helicopter crashed just short of Belgrade Nikola Tesla Airport while transporting a five-day-old baby with respiratory problems to a nearby hospital. All seven people onboard, including four crew members, two medical personnel and the baby, were killed. The baby had to be flown from Novi Pazar to Belgrade by helicopter because of a landslide-induced road obstruction. The flight was ordered by Health Minister Zlatibor Lončar and Defence Minister Bratislav Gašić. Due to inclement weather, the helicopter made several circles around the airport and two landing attempts before crashing.

After the tragedy, it was revealed that government officials had disregarded safety protocols to use the flight for propaganda purposes. This was confirmed by the fact that, before the crash, several government-affiliated news outlets had published a pre-written story describing a "successful rescue operation" only to retract it when it became clear that the flight had ended in disaster. Although the pilot had asked for permission to divert the flight to either the Military Medical Academy's heliport or the Batajnica Air Base, this was repeatedly denied. The reason was speculated to be Lončar's desire to personally welcome the baby at the airport in front of the cameras for his personal self-promotion.

A national day of mourning was declared by the Serbian government on 15 March. Although several military rules were breached by those who ordered the operation, no criminal charges were ever laid and all the blame was shifted to the pilots. This case has since often been cited as one of the best known examples of corruption and lack of accountability in Serbian politics.

== Incident ==
The Serbian Army Mil Mi-17 helicopter was carrying a five-day-old baby with life-threatening respiratory problems to Belgrade for treatment at the Institute for Health Care of Mother and Child. The military had been dispatched after an ambulance carrying the baby from Novi Pazar to Belgrade was blocked by a mudslide about 200 km (120 miles) south of Belgrade, near Raška. The helicopter departed from Novi Pazar and landed in Raška to receive the baby on board. Around 10:15 p.m. the helicopter crew made two landing attempts at the Belgrade Airport, but both were unsuccessful due to low visibility. Although the pilot asked for permission to divert the flight to either the Military Medical Academy's heliport or the Batajnica Air Base, this was repeatedly denied. The control tower lost contact with the helicopter at 10:30 p.m. and the helicopter disappeared from air traffic controllers' radar at 10.34 p.m. All seven people aboard were killed when the helicopter crashed into nearby fields. Beside the baby, the helicopter was carrying four army officers (two pilots and two flight engineers) and two medical staff (a doctor and a technician).

Brigadier general Predrag Bandić, commander of the 204th Air Brigade, said that the weather was "not dangerous, but was complex, so that pilots with such experience and equipment should have been able to handle it". He was the one who personally ordered the pilots to fly and stated that he would not have done so if the weather conditions had been dangerous.

=== Helicopter ===
The helicopter involved in the incident was a Soviet Mil Mi-17 (Serbian Army's designation HT-48), serial number 341M15, identification code 12551, manufactured in 1991. It was acquired by the Serbian police helicopter unit in 1997 or 1998 from Azerbaijan Airlines, and transferred to the military in 2002. It received one general maintenance, in 2010. The last general inspection of the helicopter was carried out in December 2014. The crew routinely checked the helicopter before the flight and observed no defects. Its magnetic compass was defunct and removed for repair in February 2015, but the commanding officer permitted the helicopter to be used without it from 2 to 16 March. The helicopter was last used on 11 March. In the military report, the helicopter was deemed to be well maintained and fully functional.

=== Victims ===
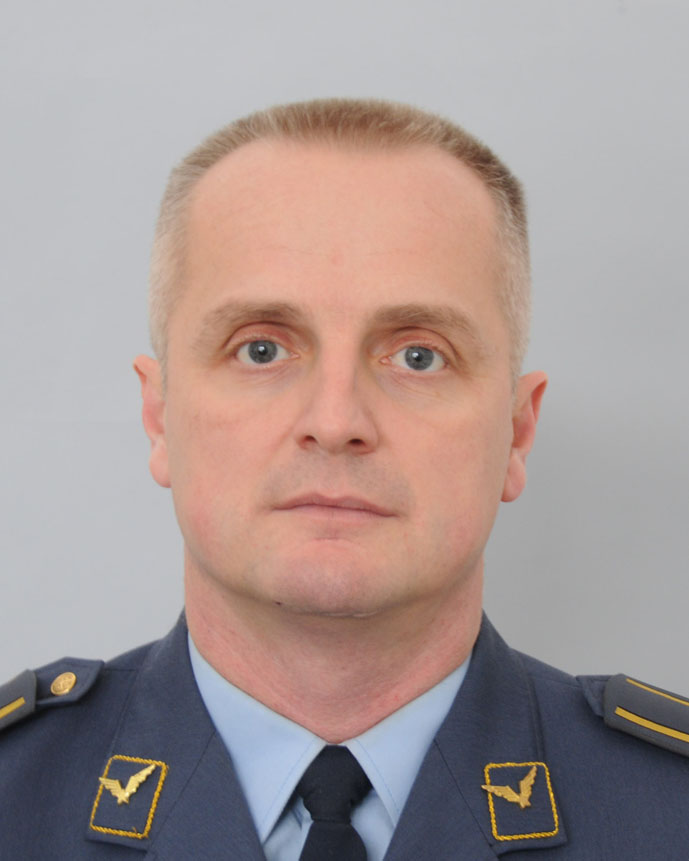
Omer Mehić, army major, pilot

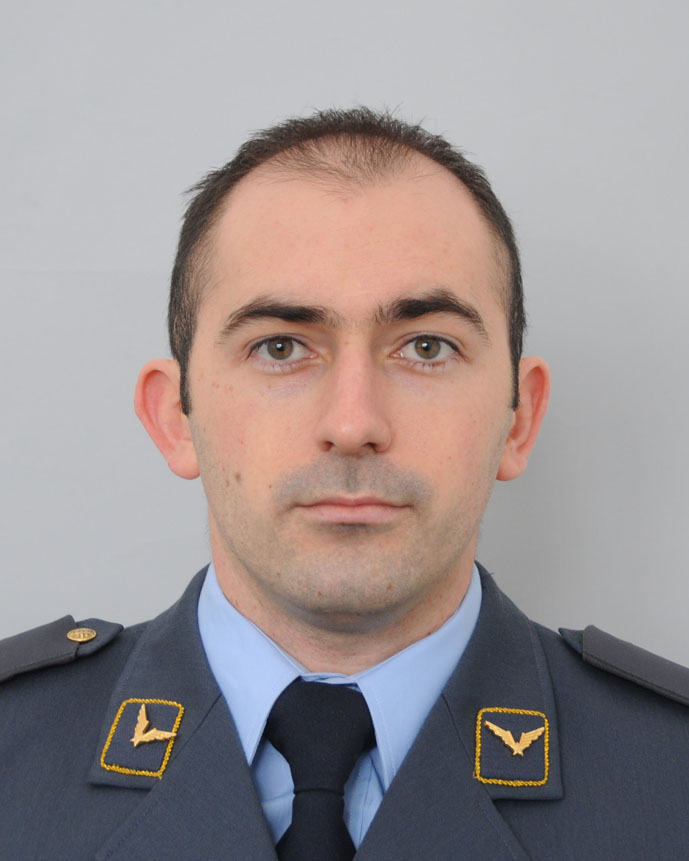
Milovan Đukarić, army captain, pilot

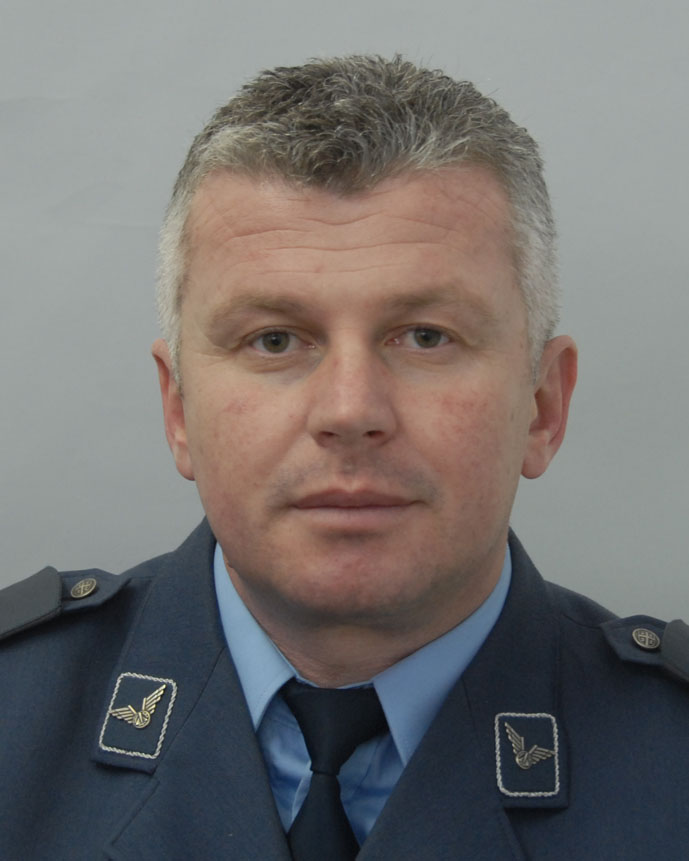
Nebojša Drajić, warrant officer, flight engineer

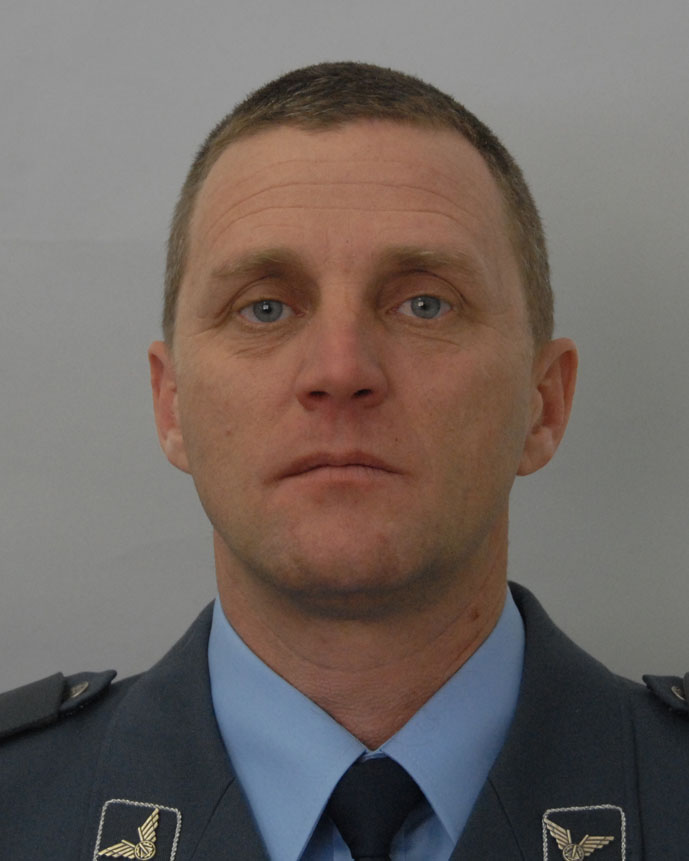
Ivan Miladinović, warrant officer, flight engineer

All seven people aboard the helicopter died in the accident:

1. Omer Mehić, army major, pilot
2. Milovan Đukarić, army captain, pilot
3. Nebojša Drajić, warrant officer, flight engineer
4. Ivan Miladinović, warrant officer, flight engineer
5. Dževad Ljajić, medical doctor
6. Miroslav Veselinović, anesthetic technician
7. unnamed 5 days old baby of the Ademović family

After the accident, defense minister Bratislav Gašić claimed that the army lost its best pilots, that Mehić was "one of the best pilots of the Serbian Army", and that he "saved more than a thousand lives in different rescue operations". He also said that Mi-17 was "the best [helicopter] in the Serbian Army" and "fully equipped for search and rescue operations". Ministry of Defense awarded 1.2 million dinars to the families of each military victim. 15 March 2015 was declared a national day of mourning by the Government of Serbia.

== Investigation ==
Two commissions were immediately formed by the Army to investigate the incident. Helicopter's flight recorder was difunctional and last record was from 2011. The commission claimed that the cause of the tragedy was "miscommunication with the air traffic control". They also claimed that Mehić had blood alcohol content of 0,068% and urine alcohol level of 0,13%. Mehić's wife said that this was impossible as her husband never drank alcohol. Despite the claim that Mehić was drunk, Serbian president Tomislav Nikolić posthumously awarded him the Medal for Bravery.

Seven months after the crash, disciplinary proceedings were initiated against Bandić and general Ranko Živak for procedure violations. They were punished with two years of prohibition of advancement in service. This was later overturned after an appeal. Fifteen months after the crash, the public prosecutor declined to investigate, citing that the military commissions found no evidence of criminal behavior.

=== Controversy ===
Soon after the crash, two questions drew controversy: Why the military helicopter was ordered to land on the civilian airport, and not on the Batajnica Airbase or the Military Medical Academy's heliport; and why was it decided to fly to Belgrade and not to much closer Kragujevac Clinical Centre. The official investigation never gave any answers to those questions.

Minutes before the crash, several media outlets reported about a "successful rescue operation" and how healthcare minister Zlatibor Lončar "personally welcomed the baby at the airport". Those reports were soon retracted, when the news about the crash arrived, although some newspapers were already sent to print, so the "news" about the "successful operation" was printed. This drew attention to the possibility that the safety of the crew was disregarded in order to use the rescue operation as a propaganda tool for Lončar. It was revealed that the whole operation was orchestrated by Zlatibor Lončar and defense minister Gašić. Retired warrant officer of the aviation Saša Jovanović said that the helicopter was ordered to land at the Belgrade airport despite low visibility, only because of the Lončar's desire to welcome the baby in front of the cameras. Although several military regulations were breached, no one was ever punished for this. The blame was shifted to the dead crew members.

The helicopter accident has since often been cited as one of the best known examples of corruption and lack of accountability in Serbian politics.

== See also ==
- List of accidents and incidents involving military aircraft (2010–2019)
