= 2021 Garaheybat Mil Mi-17 crash =

Aviation incident in Azerbaijan

Garaheybat Mil Mi-17 crash
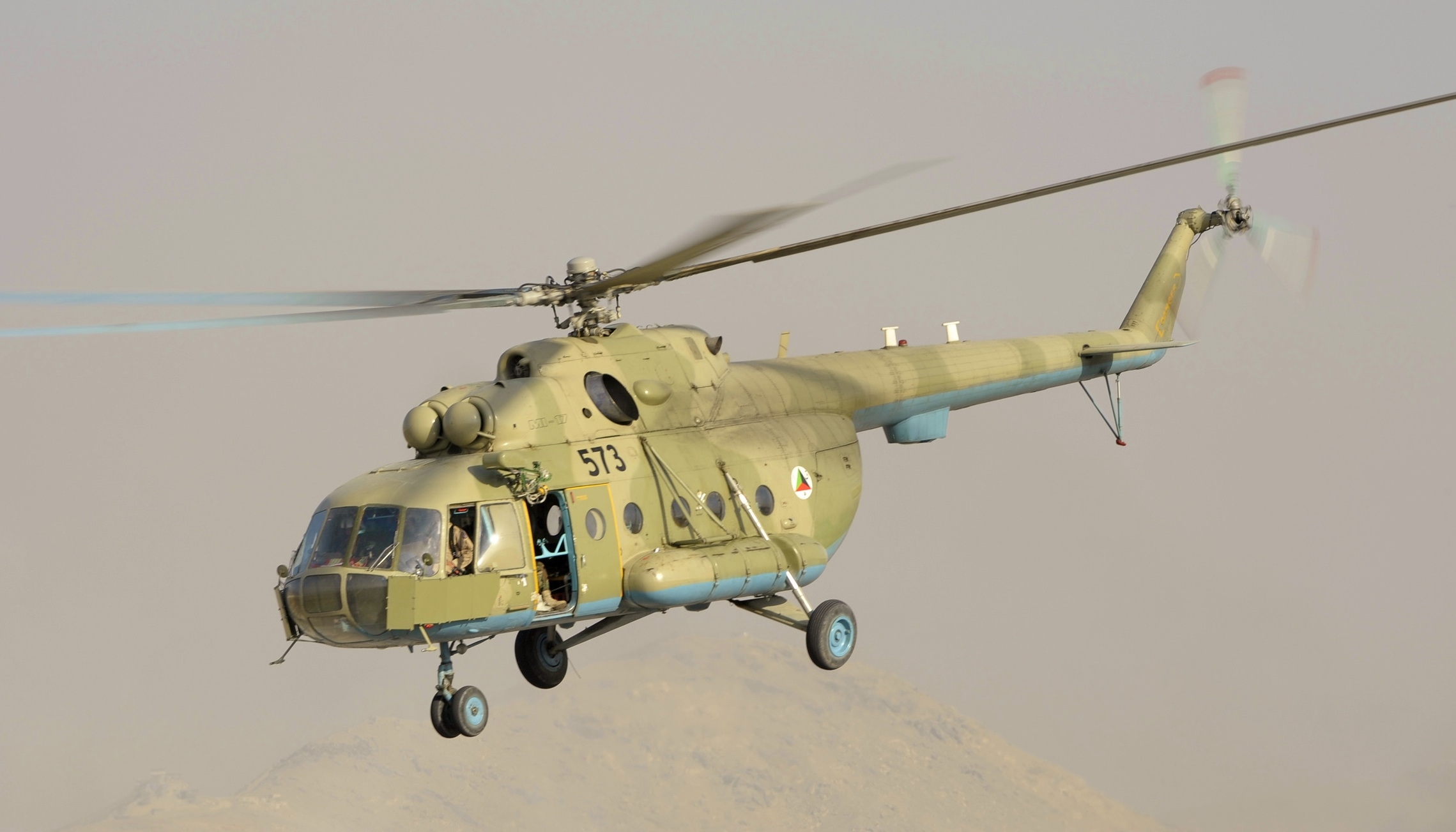
- A Mil Mi-17 during military drills similar to the one that crashed.

Occurrence
- Date: 30 November 2021
- Summary: Under investigation
- Site: Garaheybat training zone

Aircraft
- Aircraft type: Helicopter
- Aircraft name: Mil Mi-17
- Operator: State Border Service of Azerbaijan
- Registration: 20136
- Flight origin: Sangachal airfield
- Destination: Garaheybat training zone
- Occupants: 16
- Fatalities: 14
- Injuries: 2
- Survivors: 2

The Garaheybat Mil Mi-17 crash (Azerbaijani: Qaraheybət helikopter qəzası / Qaraheybət vertolyot qəzası) occurred on 30 November 2021, during military drills of Azerbaijani State Border Service (SBS) Mil Mi-17 helicopter in the Garaheybat training zone located in the Khizi District. Fourteen people were killed and two were injured in the helicopter crash. This was the largest aircraft crash in the history of Azerbaijan's law enforcement agencies.

Immediately after the accident, the representatives of the SBS and the Prosecutor General's Office arrived at scene. An investigation was launched under the leadership of Deputy Chief of the Prosecutor General's Office Elchin Mammadov. The cause of the accident is still being investigated.

President of Azerbaijan Ilham Aliyev and Vice President Mehriban Aliyeva, President of Turkey Recep Tayyip Erdoğan and other political figures in the country, foreign embassies in Azerbaijan, as well as international organizations expressed condolences to the victims.

== Background ==
The deadliest helicopter crash in the history of Azerbaijan took place on 20 November 1991, near Karakend, in Khojavend District, which resulted in the deaths of 22 people, including senior government officials. Furthermore, on 24 July 2019, an Azerbaijani Air Force MIG-29 aircraft carrying out drills suddenly disappeared from radars. The pilot, Lieutenant Colonel Rashad Atakishiyev, went missing as the plane crashed into the Caspian Sea. His body was recovered after a long-running search.

== Crash ==
On 30 November 2021, at about 10:40 local time, an Azerbaijani State Border Service Mil Mi-17 helicopter took off from the Sangachal airfield and crashed during drills at the Garaheybat training zone, located within the Khizi District. The head of the State Border Service of Azerbaijan, Elchin Guliyev, stated that the pilot was experienced and that he was a participant in the First Karabakh War, that the helicopter was almost new and had recently been repaired. Guliyev stated that the flight recorder of the helicopter was found, adding that no outside forces were involved in the incident. Emil Jafarov, a lieutenant colonel among the event's two survivors, said that there were no signs prior to the incident that the plane could crash.

According to preliminary reports, two colonels, three majors, four captains, two lieutenants and a civilian contractor were killed, while a colonel and a captain were injured in the crash.

== Aftermath ==
Immediately after the incident, the representatives of the State Border Service and the Prosecutor General's Office arrived at scene. A criminal case under Article 352.2 of the Criminal Code (violation of flight or flight preparation rules caused the death of two or more people through negligence) and other articles was initiated by the Prosecutor General's Office and the investigation was taken under special control by the Prosecutor General. The investigation team investigating the helicopter crash was headed by Deputy Chief of the Investigation Department of the Prosecutor General's Office Elchin Mammadov. The cause of the accident was not immediately clear. The bodies of the victims were brought to the Forensic Medical Expertise and Pathological Anatomy Association of the Ministry of Health in Baku, and after examination they were handed over to their families.

The head of the State Border Service of Azerbaijan Elchin Guliyev stated that the soldiers died in the accident would be given the status of "martyrs", noting that President Ilham Aliyev instructed to clarify the details of the incident, bury the fallen and do everything necessary to treat the wounded. Guliyev said he spoke on the phone with the two servicemen injured in the accident and that their state was normal.

Azerbaijan initially did not release the names of the victims, in accordance with the practice of most countries, which do not release the names until the victims' closest relatives have been alerted. The lack of more detailed information as the time passed since the incident, and the fact that the accident occurred immediately after the meetings in Ashgabat and Sochi, raised questions and misinformation in the Azerbaijani public. Political scientist Zardusht Alizadeh rejected the conspiracy theories, and added there were no suspicious case in the incident. He also stressed that this was not the first accident in the history of Azerbaijan, adding that such accidents occur all over the world.

President of Azerbaijan along with several domestic and foreign officials mourned the loss and shared condolence messages.
