= Mil Mi-17 =

Family of Russian military transport helicopters

Mi-17 / Mi-8M
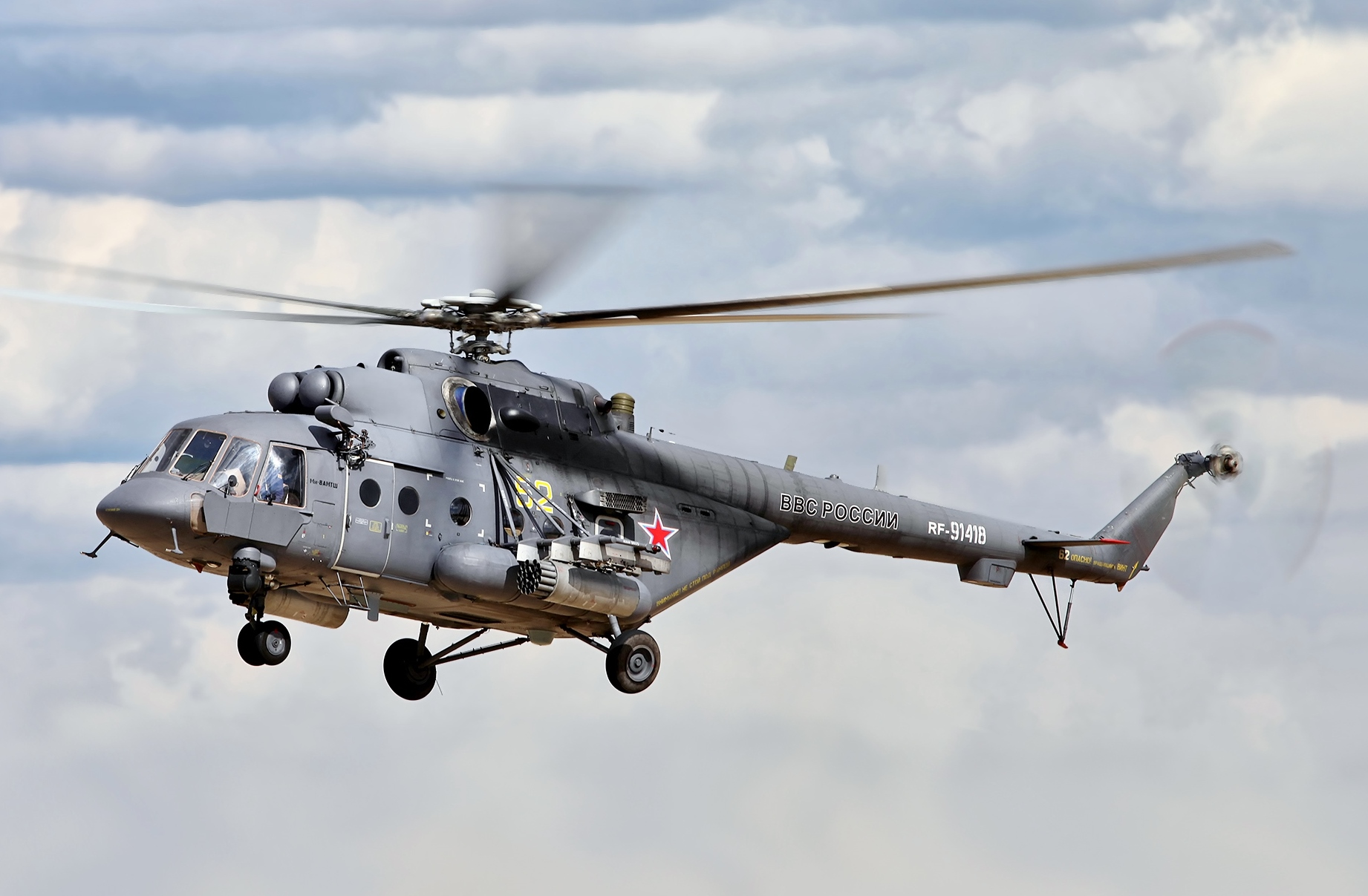
- A Mi-17 with the Russian Aerospace Forces

General information
- Type: Utility, transport, armed capable helicopter
- National origin: Soviet Union/Russia
- Designer: Mil Moscow Helicopter Plant
- Built by: Kazan Helicopter Plant; Ulan-Ude Aviation Plant
- Status: In service
- Primary users: Russia Approx. 60 other countries
- Number built: Approx. 12,000 as of 2007

History
- Manufactured: 1977–present
- Introduction date: 1977 (Mi-8MT), 1981 (Mi-17)
- First flight: 1975
- Developed from: Mil Mi-8

The Mil Mi-17 (NATO reporting name: Hip) is a Soviet-designed Russian military helicopter family introduced in 1975 (Mi-8M), continuing in production as of 2024 at two factories in Russia, in Kazan and Ulan-Ude. It is known as the Mi-8M series in Russian service. The helicopter is mostly used as a medium twin-turbine transport helicopter, as well as an armed gunship version.

== Development ==
Developed from the basic Mi-8 airframe, the Mi-17 was fitted with the larger Klimov TV3-117MT engines, rotors, and transmission developed for the Mi-14, along with fuselage improvements for heavier loads. Optional engines for "hot and high" conditions are the 1,545 kW (2,072 shp) Isotov TV3-117VM. Recent exports to China and Venezuela for use in high mountains have the new Klimov VK-2500 version of the Klimov TV3-117 engine with FADEC control.

The designation Mi-17 is for export; the Russian armed forces call it the Mi-8MT. The Mi-17 is recognisable by the tail rotor on the port side instead of the starboard side, and dust shields in front of the engine intakes. Engine cowls are shorter than on the TV2-powered Mi-8, not extending as far over the cockpit, and an opening for a bleed air valve outlet is present forward of the exhaust.

Actual model numbers vary by builder, engine type, and other options. As an example, the sixteen new Ulan Ude-built machines delivered to the Czech Air Force in 2005 with -VM model engines were designated as Mi-171Sh, a development of the Mi-8AMTSh. Modifications include a new large door on the right side, improved Czech-built APU, and Kevlar armour plates around the cockpit area and engines. Eight have a loading ramp in place of the usual clamshell doors and can load a vehicle up to the size of an SUV.

Licensed production of the Mi-17 started in China, with production being led by Mil Moscow Helicopter Plant JSC and the Sichuan Lantian Helicopter Company Limited in Chengdu, Sichuan province. The plant built 20 helicopters in 2008, using Russian Ulan-Ude-supplied kits; annual production was expected to increase to 80 helicopters. The variants planned to be built by Lantian include the Mi-171, Mi-17V-5, and Mi-17V-7. In 2021 it was reported that China was replacing the Russian-made Mi-17 with their own Z-20, except possibly for the Mi-171Sh assault helicopter; the last Mi-17 order was in 2014.

In 2021 the website of Russian Helicopters, the manufacturer, said that the Mi-8/17 was "the most widely operated helicopter in history."

== Operational history ==
An Army of North Macedonia Mi-17 performing a tight low-level right turn

Royal Cambodian Air Force Mi-17s were used during the Cambodian government's offensives; by 1994 ten operational airframes were in service, with five converted to helicopter gunships equipped with 57 mm S-5 rocket pods, providing air support for ground forces attacking the Khmer Rouge positions. In 1996 the Government launched an offensive during the dry season at the Khmer Rouge stronghold of Anlong Veng and Pailin, using five Mi-17 gunships and eight Mi-17-Mi-8 troops transports.

In May 1999, during Operation Safed Sagar, the Mi-17 was used in the first air phase of the Kargil War by 129HU of the Indian Air Force (IAF) against the Pakistan Army. One IAF Mi-17 and one IAF MiG-21 escort were shot down by Pakistan Army Air Defence Anza-II shoulder-fired missiles. This led to the withdrawal of armed helicopters and attacks by fixed-wing aircraft such as the Mirage 2000 armed with LGBs in the Kargil theatre.

The Mi-17 was used extensively by the Sri Lanka Air Force in Sri Lanka's war on terrorism by the LTTE. Seven of them were lost in combat and attacks on airports.

Freelance pilot Neall Ellis operated an Mi-17 in support of the Sierra Leone government in the Sierra Leone Civil War, ferrying ammunition and other supplies to government troops.

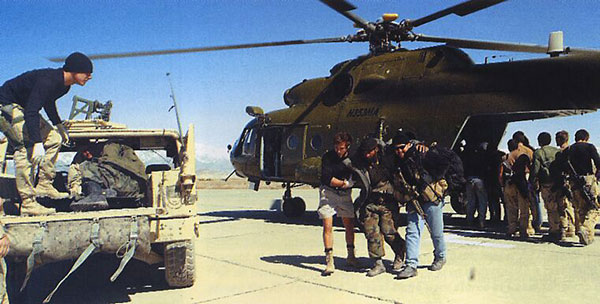
US special forces help Northern Alliance troops from a CIA-operated MI-17 at Bagram Airbase during Operation Anaconda, 2002.

US Army Special Forces in Afghanistan extensively used CIA-operated Mi-17s during the initial stages of Operation Enduring Freedom.

The Mi-17 is used for passenger transport by Air Koryo, national airline of North Korea. Previous flights include those between Pyongyang and Kaesong and Pyongyang and Haeju.

The Mexican Navy uses its Mi-17s for anti-narcotic operations such as locating marijuana fields and dispatching marines to eradicate the plantations.

The Slovak Air Force and Croatian Air Force operated Mi-17s in Kosovo as part of KFOR.

Both the pro-Gaddafi and anti-Gaddafi forces in the 2011 Libyan civil war have operated Mi-17s.

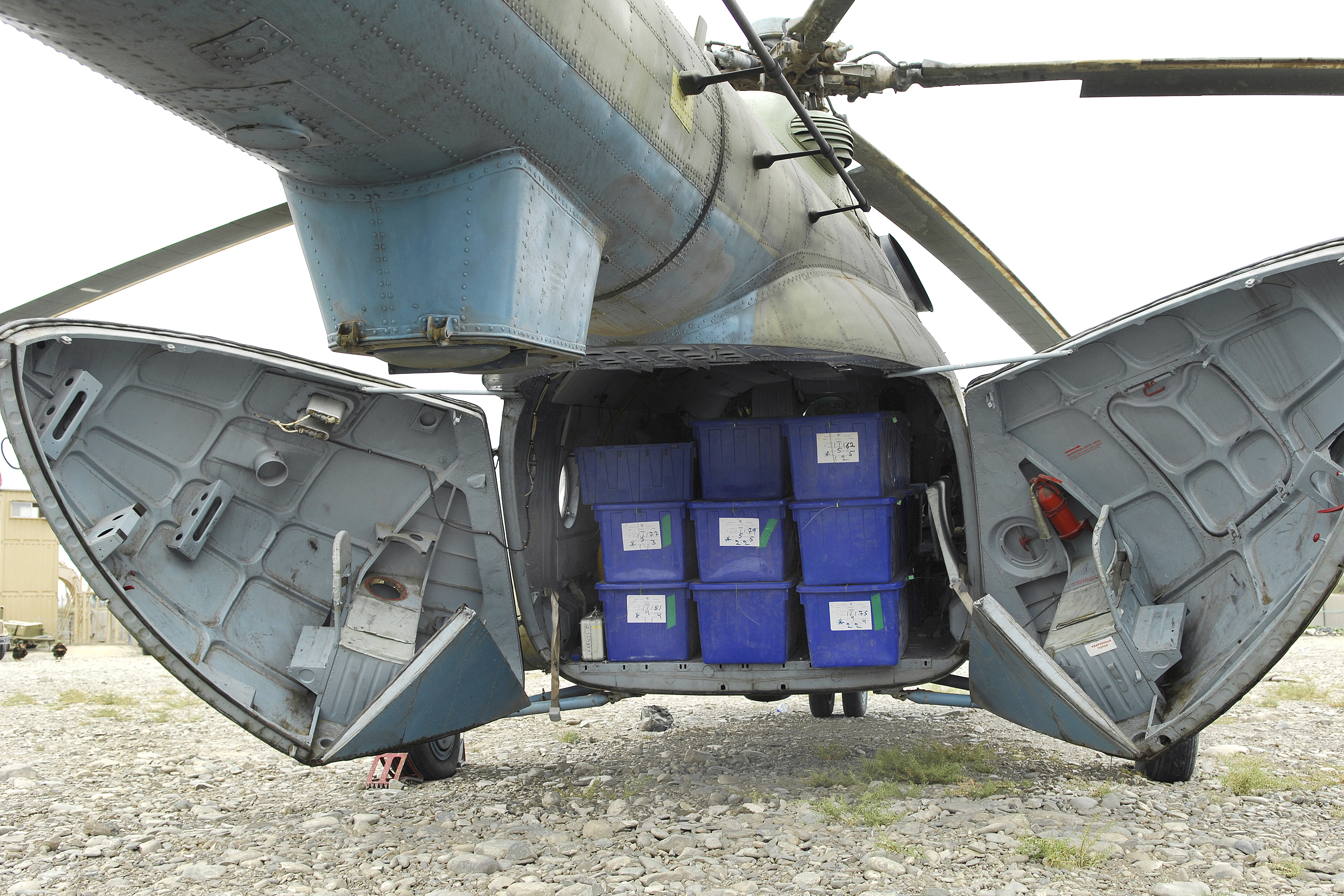
Afghan Air Force Mi-17 showing the clamshell cargo door arrangement

Mi-17s are operated by the Afghan Air Force. In July 2010 two Mi-17 were flown by a mixed crew of United States Air Force and Afghan Air Force personnel in a 13-hour mission that rescued 2,080 civilians from flood waters. This was the largest rescue by two helicopters in USAF history. USAF pilot Lt Col Gregory Roberts received the Distinguished Flying Cross for the mission.

During the Tham Luang cave rescue in July 2018, the Royal Thai Army used the Mi-17 helicopter for searching operations, and evacuating the first batch of survivors from Tham Luang to Chiang Rai hospital; on 10 July 2018 a Mil Mi-17 helicopter took the last evacuated boy to the hospital.

During the 19 November 2023 Houthi hijacking of the Galaxy Leader, one Mi-17 helicopter was used to land the hijacking team on the deck of the Galaxy Leader.

In August 2025, the Indian Air Force, from its Northern Sector, deployed five of its Mi-17 helicopters along with a Chinook and C-130J transport aircraft each for the flood relief operations following the Uttarakhand and Kishtwar district flash floods. IAF Mi-17s equipped with Bambi Buckets were also deployed to stop the spread of forest fires in Arunachal Pradesh and Nagaland in early 2026, dropping nearly 12,000 tonnes of water and fire retardant from low altitudes. The IAF is also refitting certain Mi-17V5 units to carry the Spike missile.

On 29 April 2026, the Unmanned Systems Forces (Ukraine) destroyed four helicopters, two Mi-28s and two Mi-17s, while refuelling in Voronezh Oblast using drones.

== Orders (2000 onwards) ==
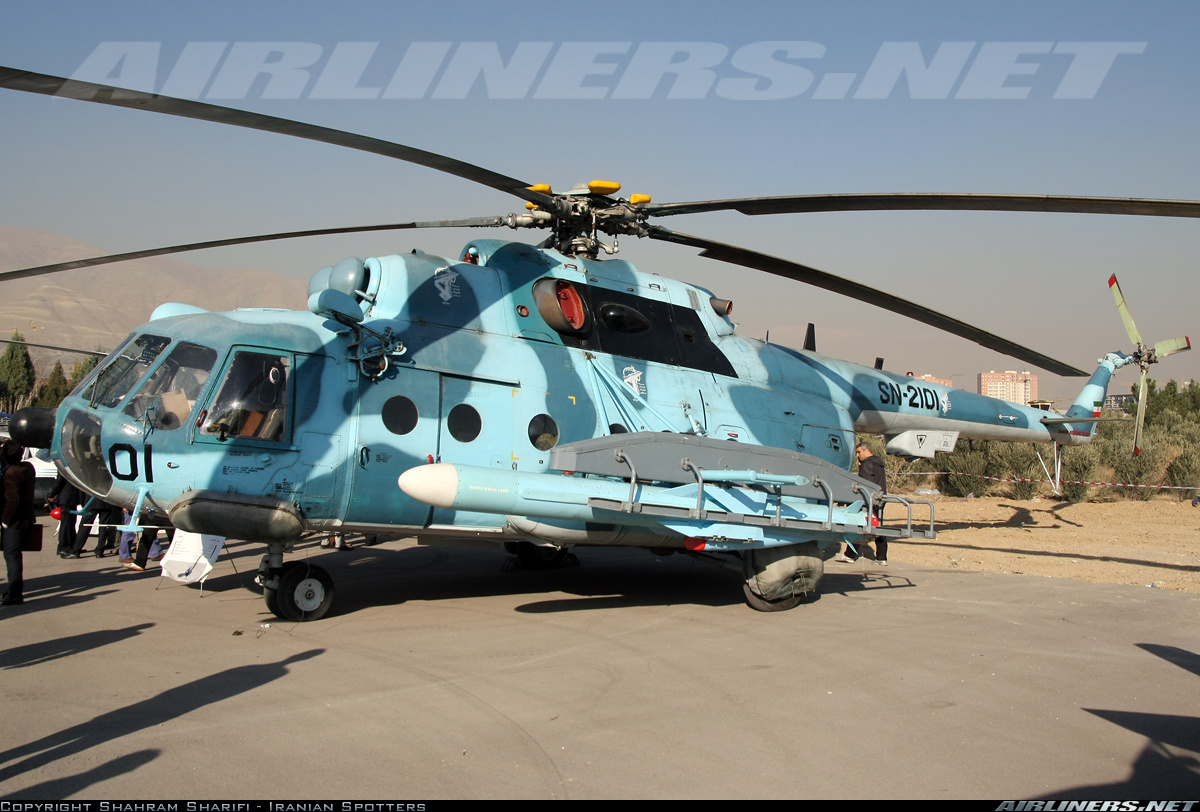
Iranian Mi-171Sh armed with unidentified cruise missiles

In October 2007, the Saudi Arabian Government cancelled the purchase of 64 NHIndustries NH90 helicopters and agreed to buy 150 Russian-made Mil Mi-17 and Mi-35 helicopters instead.

On 28 October 2008, the Royal Thai Army announced a deal to buy six Mi-17s to meet its requirement for a medium-lift helicopter. This is the first time the Thai armed forces have acquired Russian aircraft instead of American aircraft. Flight International quotes the Thai Army's rationale: "We are buying three Mi-17 helicopters for the price of one Black Hawk. The Mi-17 can also carry more than 30 troops, while the Black Hawk could carry only 13 soldiers. These were the key factors behind the decision."

On 15 December 2008, it was reported that India ordered 80 Mi-17V-5 helicopters worth $1.375 billion, which would be delivered to the Indian Air Force between 2011 and 2014 to replace aging Mi-8s. In August 2010, it was reported that India planned to order another 59 Mi-17s. The first Mi-17V-5s entered service with India in February 2012. In December 2012, India signed a contract for 71 aircraft at a reported cost of US$1.3 billion. In December 2014 it was reported that India is in agreement with the Russian Federation to produce on its territory Mi-17s and Ka-226Ts. All 151 helicopters were delivered as of February 2016.

On 11 June 2009, it was announced that the United States had handed over four Mi-17 cargo helicopters to the Pakistan Army to facilitate its counter-terrorism operations. This followed an urgent request for helicopters by Pakistan's Chief of Army Staff General Ashfaq Parvez Kayani in a leaked US embassy cable.

On 16 September 2009, the United States Navy delivered the last two of four Mi-17s to the Afghan National Army Air Corps. On 19 June 2010, it was announced that the US government would buy and refurbish 31 more Mi-17 helicopters from Russia to supply the Afghan Air Force.

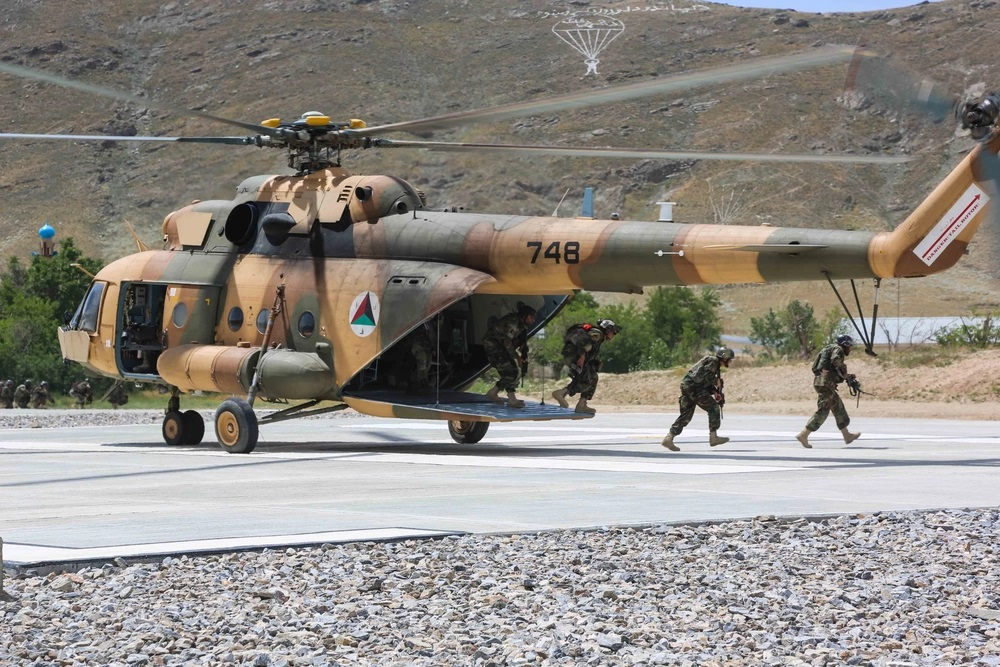
Afghan Commandos exiting a Mi-17 of the Special Missions Wing of the Afghan Air Force during a training exercise

The US was reportedly considering adding the helicopter to the US military for special forces use in order to obscure troop movements. The US has used some Mi-8s and Mi-17s for training, and has purchased units for allies in Iraq, Afghanistan and Pakistan.

In August 2010 a contract was signed by the Argentine Air Force for two Mi-17Es, plus an option on another three, to support Antarctic bases.

In September 2010, the Polish Defense Minister announced that his country would buy five new Mi-17s from Russia, to support Polish operations in Afghanistan. All five Mi-17-1Vs were delivered by 2011.

In 2011, Chief of Staff of the Afghan National Army Abdul Wahab Wardak announced that the US government would buy Mi-17s for use by Afghanistan's troops. He explained the choice of the Russian helicopter over the American Chinook was due to the familiarity of the Afghan technical and pilot staff with the helicopter type and that it is better suited for Afghanistan's environment. The United States continued to purchase the helicopters for Afghanistan in 2013, despite a congressional prohibition. Overall, 63 Mi-17s were acquired through the 2011 contract at a cost of US$16.4 to US$18.4 million each, or US$4 to US$6 million more each than a refurbished American Chinook.

China signed two contracts with Rosoboronexport in 2009 and 2012 for 32 and 52 Mi-171E, respectively.

In 2014 and 2015, Bangladesh ordered a total of 11 Mi-171Sh helicopters. 5 more ordered in 2017.

The Helicopters of Russia has concluded a contract with the Defense Ministry of Belarus for the supply of twelve Mi-8MTV-5 military transport helicopters in 2016–2017. The Belarusian military will get the helicopters possessing the same parameters as those used by the Russian military.

In the course of the Army-2017 International Military Technical Forum signed a contract for the supply of helicopters to Russian state special purpose aviation. Three Mi-8AMTSh military transport helicopters were produced and three more were ordered later.

Royal Thai Army ordered 2 Mi-17V-5s in September 2017 which received in December 2018 plus 3 more received in March 2021 for a total of 10 delivered since 2011. RF National Guard ordered two Mi-8AMTSHs in April 2018.

Russia supplied seven Mi-35 and three Mi-17 helicopters to Serbia.

A contract was signed on 18 January 2019 between Russian Helicopters, Kazakhstan Engineering, and Kazakh firm Aircraft Repair Plant No 405 (ARP 405) that will see 45 kit versions of the Mil Mi-8AMT and Mi-171 helicopters delivered to Kazakhstan until 2025 for local assembly.

In 2019, China ordered 100 Mi-171 (including 18 combat-transport Mi-171Sh) and 21 Kazan Ansat helicopters. A contract with the civilian airline QINGDAO for the supply of six Mi-171 helicopters with VK-2500-03 engines was signed in December 2019.

In 2019, the Philippine Air Force reportedly expressed its interest in acquiring 16 Mi-171 helicopters for its heavy-lift helicopter requirement, with a possible option to add one Mi-171 that is fitted for VVIP transport, in a deal worth P12.5 billion to be signed during the official visit to Russia by President Rodrigo Duterte. From 3 to 7 March 2020, a delegation composed of Philippine military and defense officials, and officials of the Embassy of the Philippines in Russia met with representatives from Sovtechnoexport and visited the Ulan-Ude Aviation Plant. Local defense blog Maxdefense Philippines reported that a Notice of Award (NOA) was issued during the third quarter of 2020, although it was unclear if it was awarded to Sovtechnoexport or Rosoboronexport. On 27 July 2022, the Philippine government canceled the deal to purchase 16 Mi-17 helicopters due to fears of possible US sanctions.

In 2021 Russia offered the Argentine Air Force Mil Mi-17 helicopters as part of a bigger arms deals.

Russia in October 2021 delivered to Mali 2 Mi-171Sh and 2 Mi-17V-5 helicopters in the framework of a contract signed in December 2020.

Bangladesh and Peru each ordered two Mi-171A2s in 2021.

On 13 April 2022, US President Joe Biden announced that the US Government would supply 11 Mi-17 helicopters to the Ukrainian government to aid in its defense during the Russian invasion of Ukraine. The US supplied 16 Mi-17s including five that were undergoing maintenance in Ukraine when Russia invaded. These helicopters belonged to the former Afghan government, but were paid for by the US under the Afghanistan Security Forces Fund. Therefore, the Pentagon treated these aircraft as its property after that government fell in September 2021.

Iran reportedly ordered 12 search and rescue helicopters of the Mi-8/17/171 family in early 2024. Iran reportedly ordered an additional 21 Mi-171 transport helicopters in mid-2026.

== Variants ==
=== Soviet/Russian variants ===
Mi-8MT
Basic updated version of the Mi-8T, powered by two 1,397 kW (1,874 hp) Klimov TV3-117MT turboshaft engines. Provision for twin or triple external stores racks. The export version is known as Mi-17.
Mi-8MTV
Hot and High version, powered by two Klimov TV3-117VM high-altitude turboshaft engines. This type has a maximum ceiling of 6,000 m.
Mi-8MTV-1
Radar-equipped civil version of the Mi-8MTV. Russian designation of the Mi-17-1V.
Mi-8MTV-2
Improved version of the Mi-8MTV-1 with enhanced armour, updated systems, an anti-torque rotor and accommodation for 30 instead of 24 troops.
Mi-8MTV-3
Military version of the Mi-8MTV-2, fitted with four instead of six hardpoints, the number of possible external stores combinations was increased from 8 to 24.

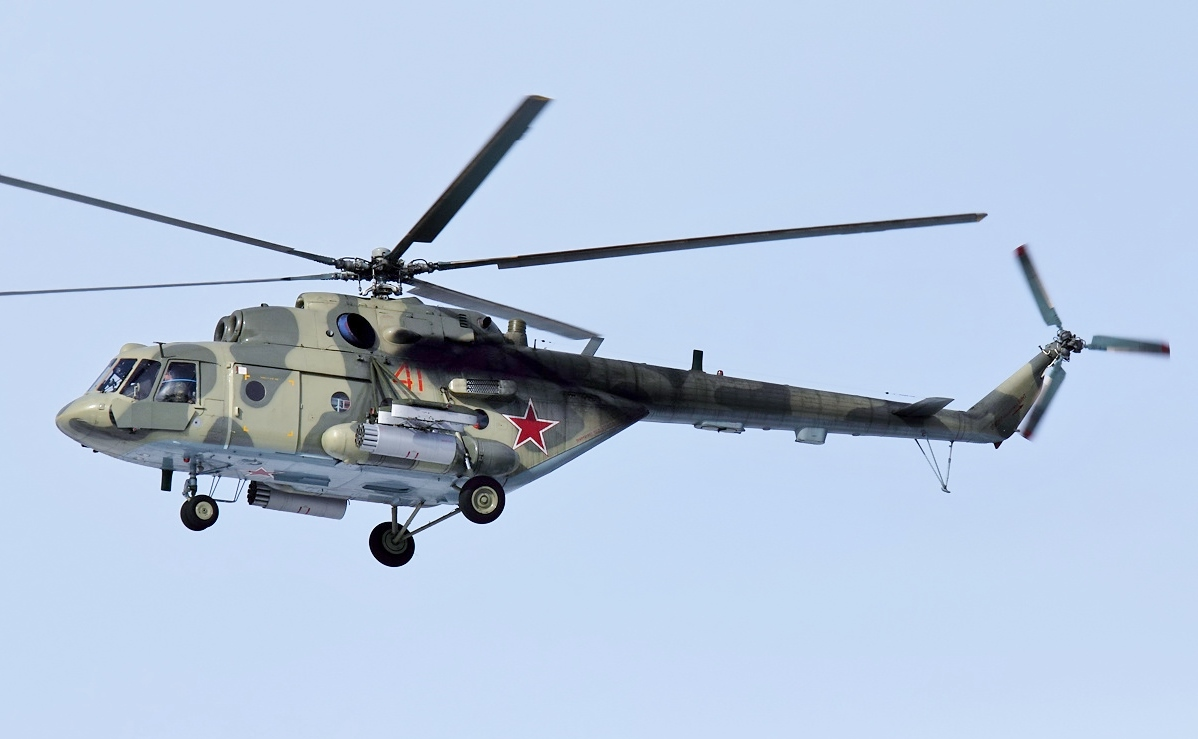
Russian Air Force Mi-8MTV-5

Mi-8MTV-5
Military utility transport helicopter, powered by two Klimov TV3-117VM turboshaft engines and equipped with a loading ramp instead of the clam-shell doors, an additional door and a new "dolphin nose". Deliveries to the VVS began in 2012, and continued in 2013 and 2014. Russia currently uses improved Mi-8 MTV-5-1s. These helicopters are intended for the transport of goods and machinery weighing up to 4 tons and these helicopters are equipped with optional rocket or cannon armament. The cockpit lighting is modified to support night vision goggles and the communication systems have been modernized. As of January 2019, the manufacturer has supplied 130 Mi-8MTV-5s out of 140 to the Defense Ministry. The Mi-8 MTV-5M version equipped with a new autopilot and passive interference system entered service in 2025.
Mi-8MTV-5-Ga
Civilian version of the Mi-8MTV-5.
Mi-8AMT
Slightly modified version of Kazan's Mi-8MTV, built in Ulan-Ude Aviation Plant from 1991 and still powered by TV3-117VM engines although nowadays VK-2500 engines are optional. Also known as Mi-171. An Arctic version was put into production in 2020.
Mi-8AMTSh
Armed transport version with improved navigation and targeting systems. It carries guided and unguided weapons, guns and active self defense systems and can host up to 40 persons or up to 4 tons of cargo. The Russian Air Force received a first batch of 10 Mi-8AMTSh in December 2010, and a second batch in June 2011. In total, 40 helicopters were delivered in 2014. The Mi-8AMTSh-VN "Sapsan" fire support version for special forces was reportedly first delivered in December 2021.
Mi-8AMTSh-VA
Arctic version of Mi-8AMTSh is supplied to the Russian Aerospace Forces and Naval Aviation.

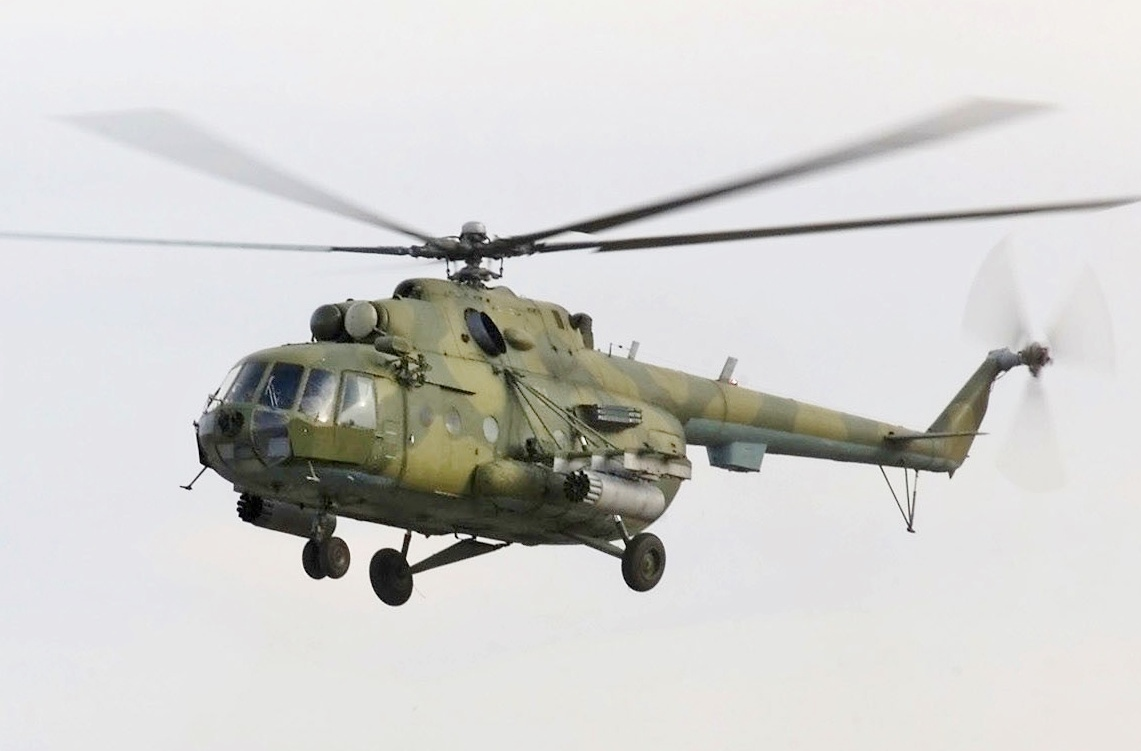
Kazakhstan Air Force Mil Mi-8MT

Mi-8MTKO
Night attack conversion of the Mi-8MT and Mi-8MTV helicopters. Known in Belarus as Mi-8MTKO1.
Mi-8MTD
Electronic warfare version of the Mi-8MT
Mi-8MTF
Aerial photography variant based on the Mi-8MT
Mi-8MTG
Electronic warfare version of the Mi-8MT with "Gardenya-1FVE" single H/I-band jamming system. Export designation Mi-17PG.
Mi-8MTI (NATO Hip-H EW5)
Electronic warfare version of the Mi-8MT with "Ikebana" single D-band jamming system. Also known as Mi-13, export designation Mi-17PI.
Mi-8MTPB (NATO Hip-H EW3)
Electronic warfare version of the Mi-8MT with "Bizon" jamming system. Export designation Mi-17PP.
Mi-8MTPSh
Electronic warfare version of the Mi-8MT with "Shakhta" jamming system. Export designation Mi-17PSh.
Mi-8MTR1
Electronic warfare version of the Mi-8MT. The Russian Air Force (VVS) received three new Mi-8MTPR-1 electronic warfare (EW) helicopters on 4 March 2014. Mi-8MTPR-1 is a standard Mi-8MTV-5-1 with a 'Rychag-AV' active jamming station installed on board. The helicopters are designed to be able to detect and suppress electronic command-and-control systems as well as the radars of surface-to air and air-to-air missiles. Additional Mi-8MTPR-1s are currently under construction, with the Russian Ministry of Defence is set to eventually receive 18 of the EW helicopters.
Mi-8MTR2
Electronic warfare version of the Mi-8MT.
Mi-8MTS
Sigint version of the Mi-8MT.
Mi-8MTSh1
Electronic warfare version of the Mi-8MT.

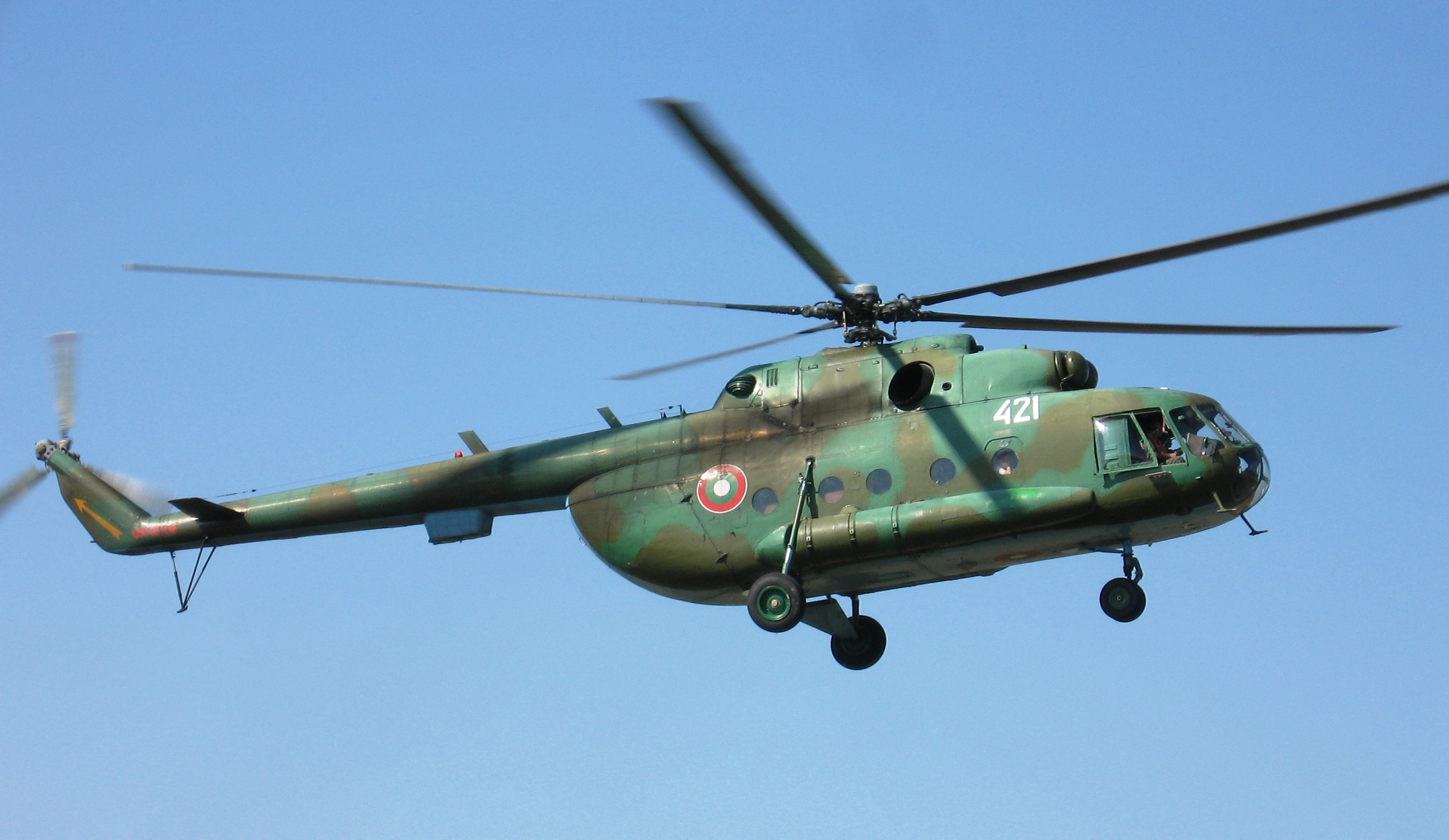
Bulgarian Air Force Mi-17

Mi-8MTSh2 (NATO Hip-H EW4)
Electronic warfare version of the Mi-8MT.
Mi-8MTSh3 (NATO Hip-H EW6)
Electronic warfare version of the Mi-8MT.
Mi-8MTT
Sigint version of the Mi-8MT.
Mi-8MTYa
Electronic warfare version of the Mi-8MT with "Yakhont" system.
Mi-8MS
VIP version. Subvariants are Mi-8MSO and Mi-8MSD.
Mi-19
Airborne command post version for tank and motorized infantry commanders (based on Mi-8MT/Mi-17 airframe).
Mi-19R
Airborne command post version similar to Mi-19 for commanders of rocket artillery (based on Mi-8MT/Mi-17 airframe).

=== Export variants ===
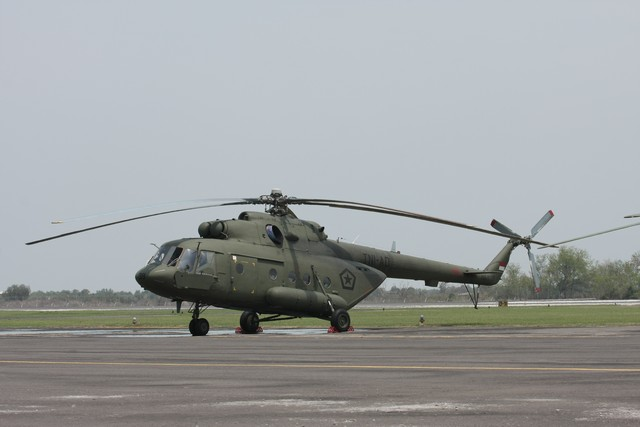
Indonesian Army Aviation Mi-17V-5

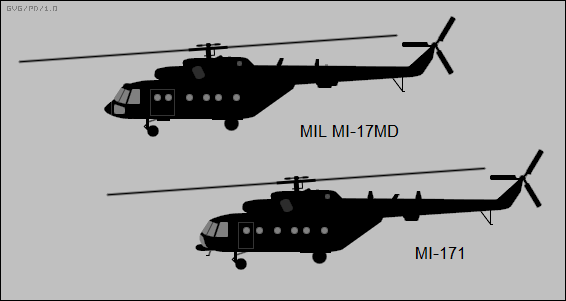
Mi-17MD compare to an Mi-171

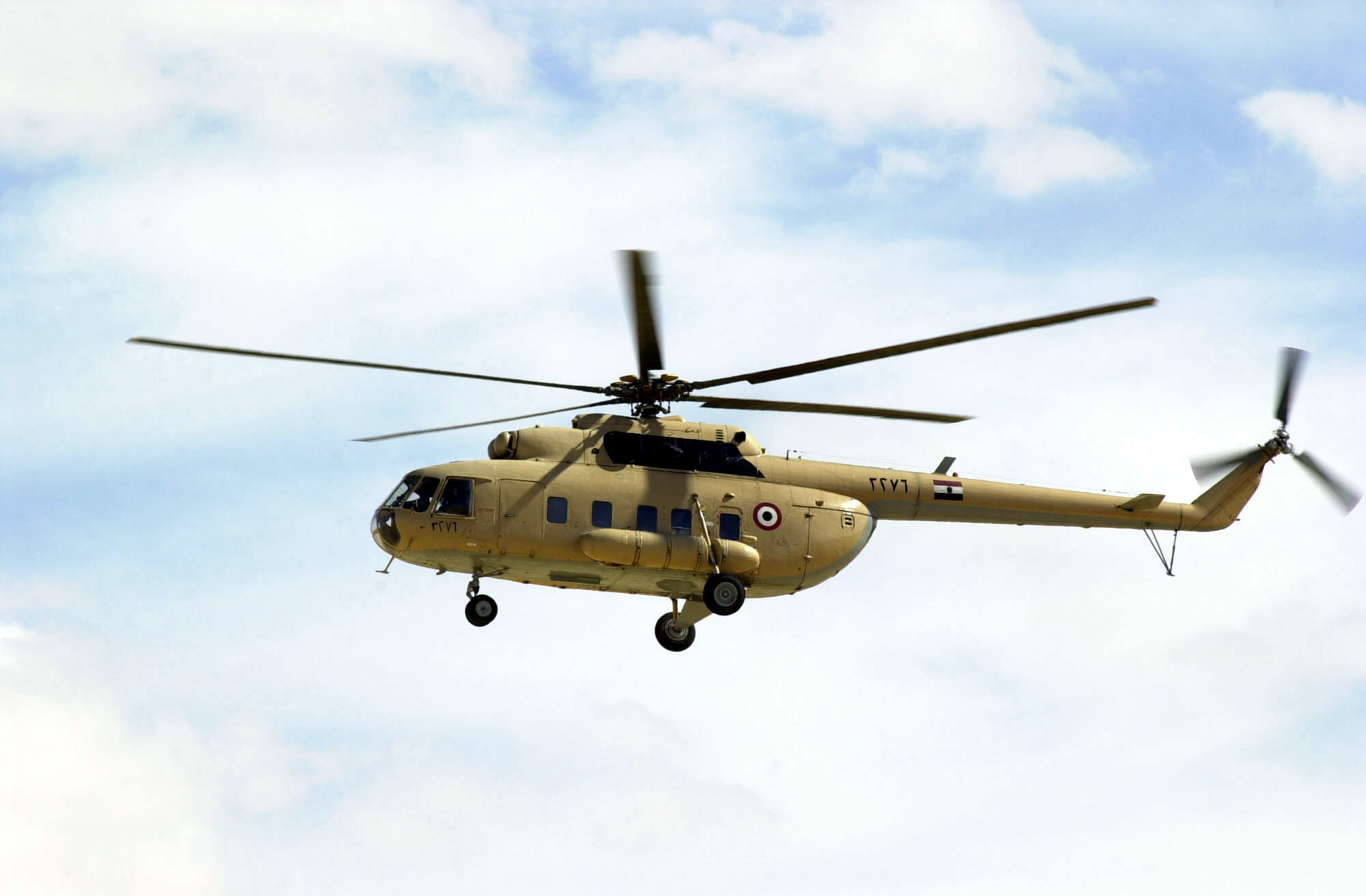
An Egyptian Air Force Mi-17 flies over a live fire Exercise (CALFEX) near Mubarak

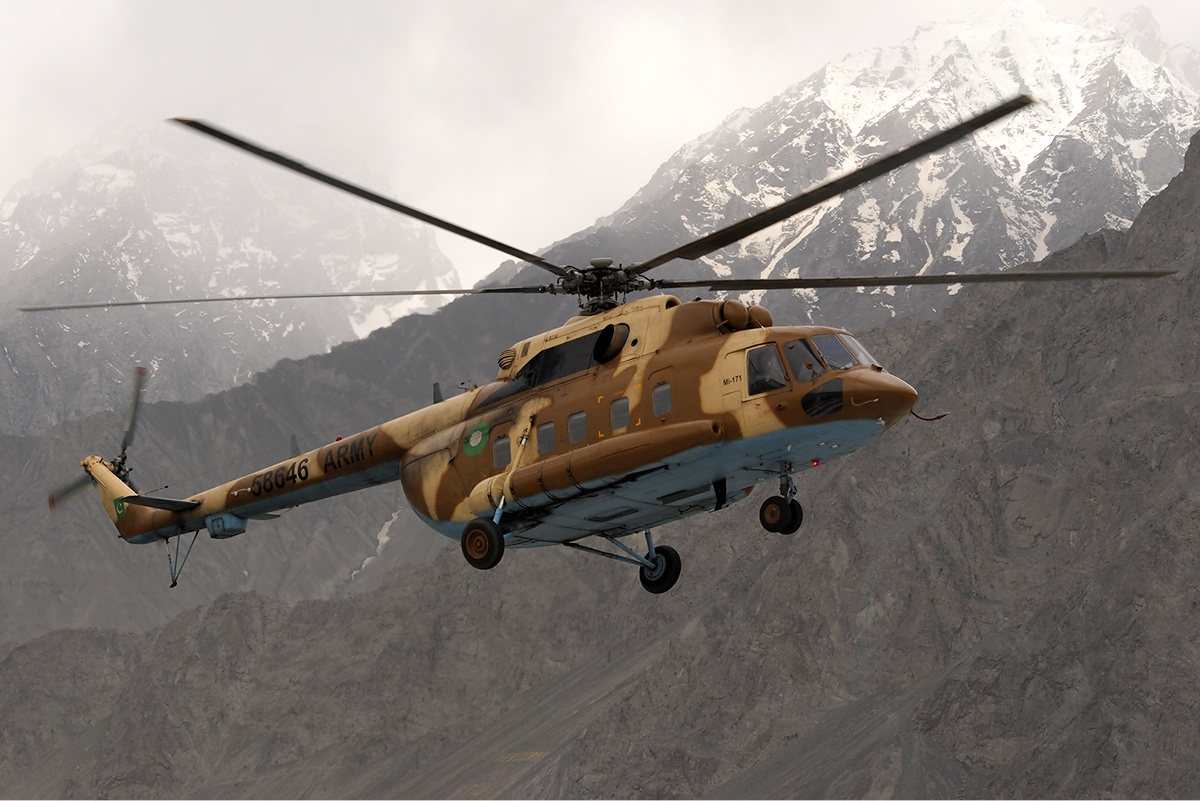
A Pakistan Army Mil Mi-17

Mi-17 (NATO Hip-H)
Improved version of the Mi-8, powered by two Klimov TV3-117MT turboshaft engines. Basic production version.

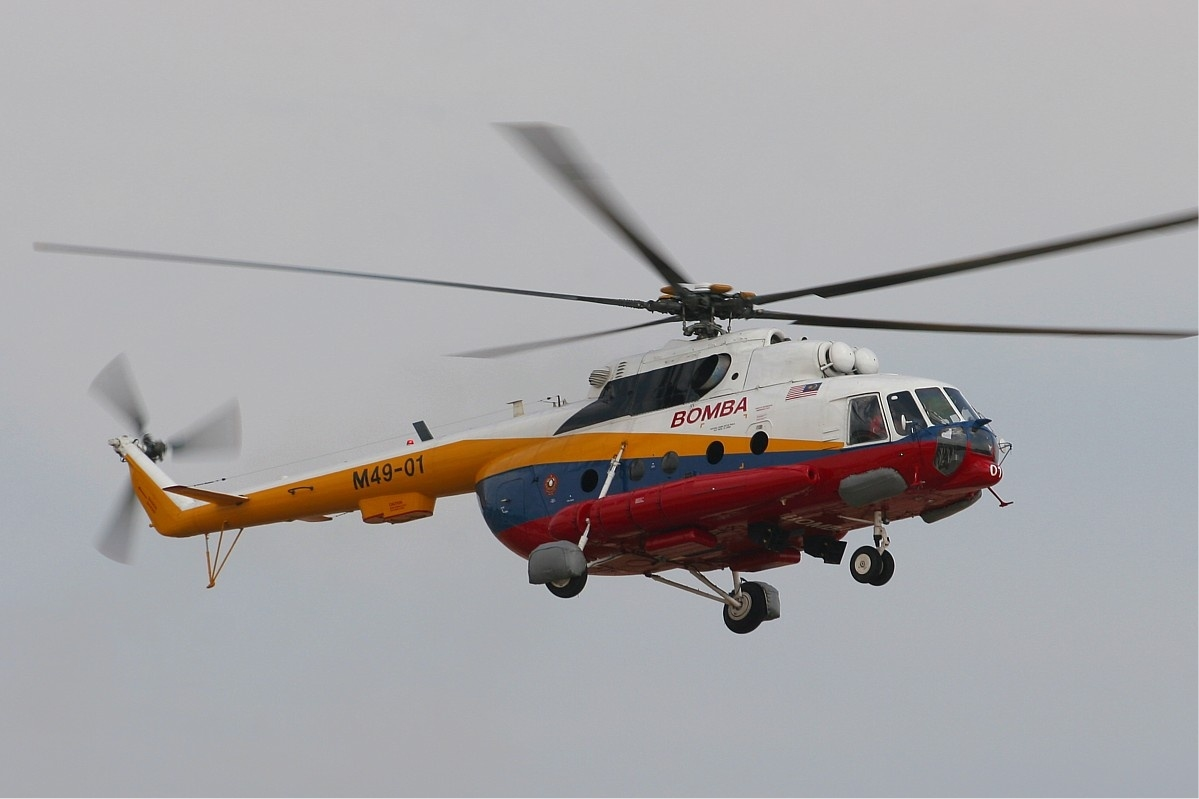
Malaysian Fire and Rescue Department Mi-17-1V

Mi-17-1
Export version of Mi-8AMT powered by two Klimov VK-2500 engines.
Mi-17-1M
High altitude operations version, powered by two Klimov TV3-117VM turboshaft engines.
Mi-17-1V
Military transport, helicopter gunship version, powered by two Klimov TV3-117VM turboshaft engines. Export version of the Mi-8MTV-1.
Mi-17-1VA
Flying hospital version.
Mi-17-2
Export version of Mi-8MTV-2.
Mi-17V-3
Export version of the Mi-8MTV-3.
Mi-17V-5
Export version of the Mi-8MTV-5. This variant is designated CH-178 by the Canadian Forces.
Mi-17V-7
Mi-17V-5 equipped with VK-2500 engine and clam shell doors.
Mi-17M
Demonstration model from 1993, served as the basis for the Mi-17MD (nowadays known as Mi-17V-5).
Mi-17MD
Initial designator of the Mi-17V-5, developed in 1995 and from 1996 fitted with a loading ramp.

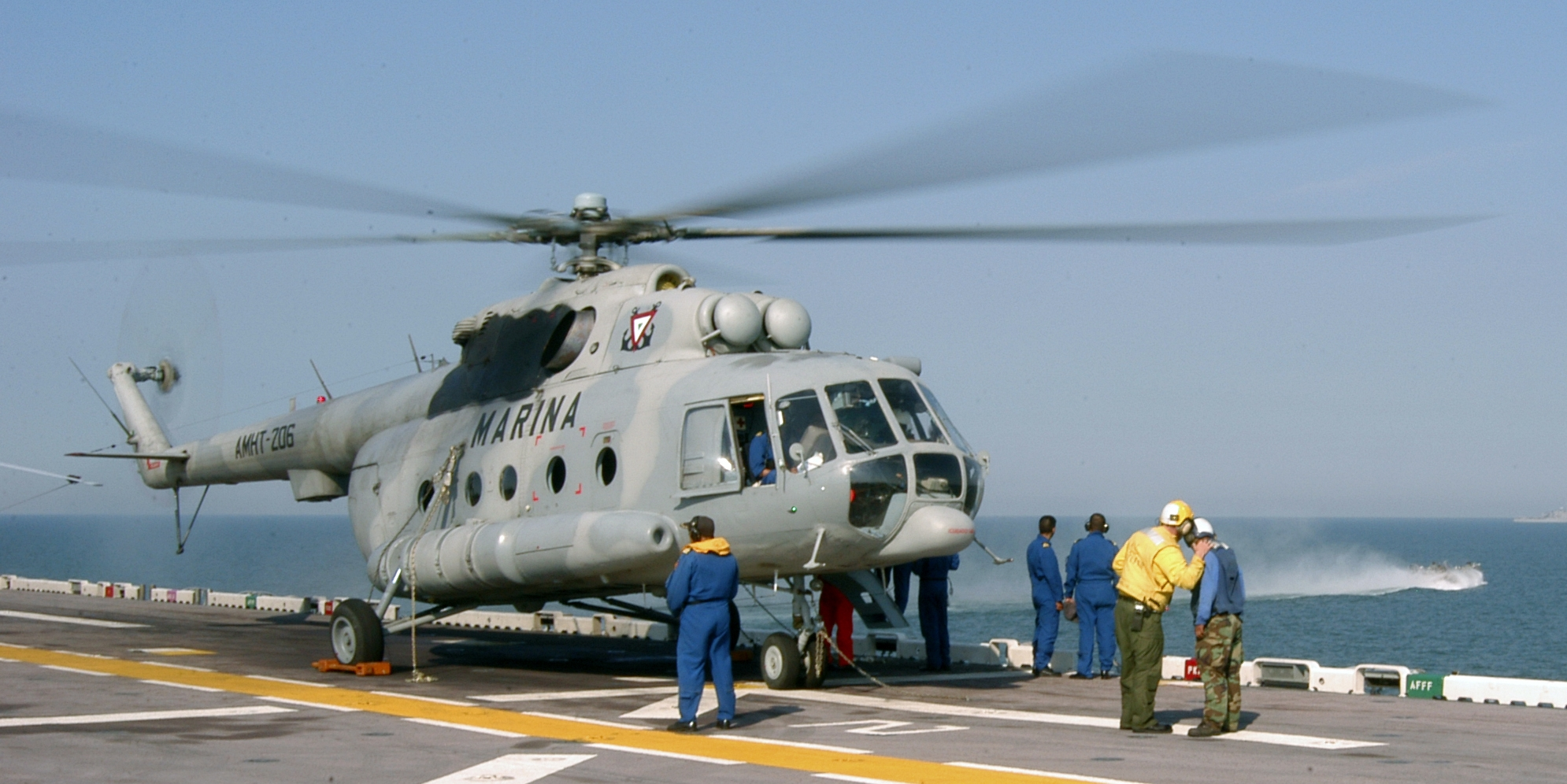
A Mexican Navy Mi-17 on the USS Bataan (LHD-5)

Mi-17KF
Export version fitted with new avionics including Inertial Navigation Unit along with GPS at tail boom.
Mi-17N
Export version of the Mi-8MTKO with GOES-321M turret with LLLTV and FLIR.
Mi-17P
Export version, passenger transport helicopter.
Mi-17PG
Export version of the Mi-8MTG.
Mi-17PI
Export version of the Mi-8MTI.
Mi-17PP
Export version of the Mi-8MTPB.
Mi-17S
VIP version.

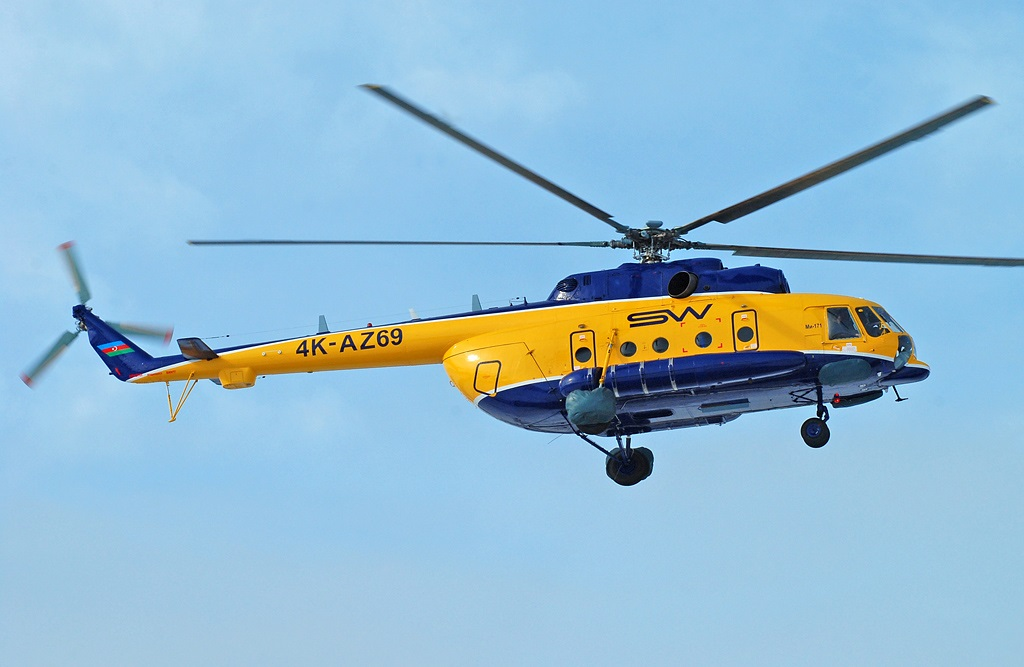
An Azerbaijani Mi-17

Mi-17AE
SAR and Medevac version given to Poland.
Mi-17 LPZS
Specialised version for the SAR units (Leteckej Pátracej a Záchrannej Služby) of Slovakia. Four ordered.
Mi-17Z-2 "Přehrada"
Czech electronic warfare version with two large canisters on each side.

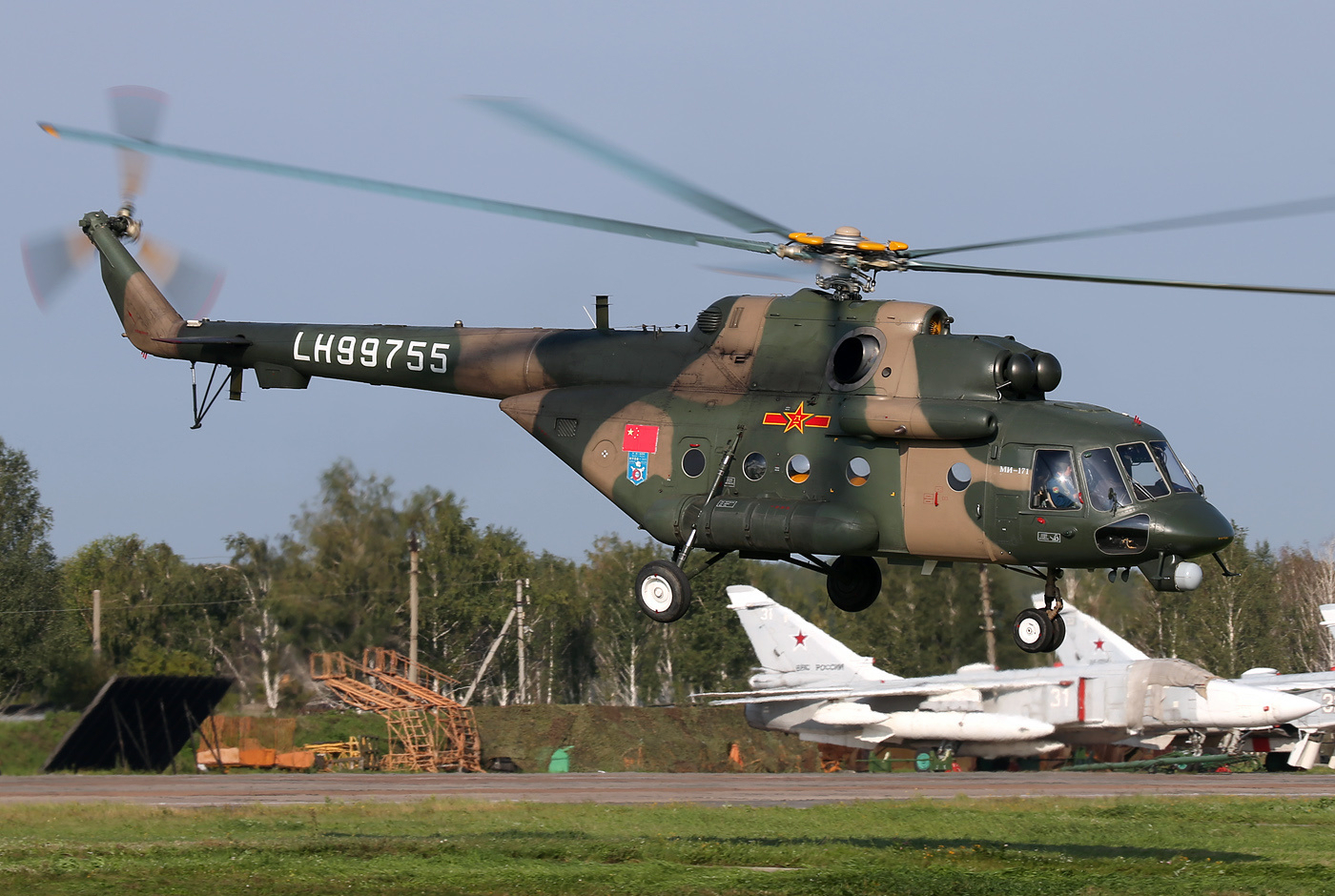
A People's Liberation Army Ground Force Aviation Mi-171

Mi-171
Export version of the Mi-8AMT, built in Ulan-Ude.
Mi-171A
Mi-171 civilian passenger helicopter modified to meet FAR 29 and JAR 29 requirement.
Mi-171A1
Mi-171 civilian cargo helicopter modified to meet FAR 29 and JAR 29 requirement.
Mi-171A2
The Mi-171A2 has been certified by India, Colombia and South Korea as of late 2020, followed by Vietnam in June 2021.
Mi-171A3
Newest modification based on the previous Mi-171A2 variant and the Mil Mi-38 transport helicopter, first revealed on 26 February 2019. The Mi-171A3 will be intended primarily for transport flights to offshore drilling platforms. The first 3 helicopters were delivered to Gazprom company in June 2026.
Mi-171C

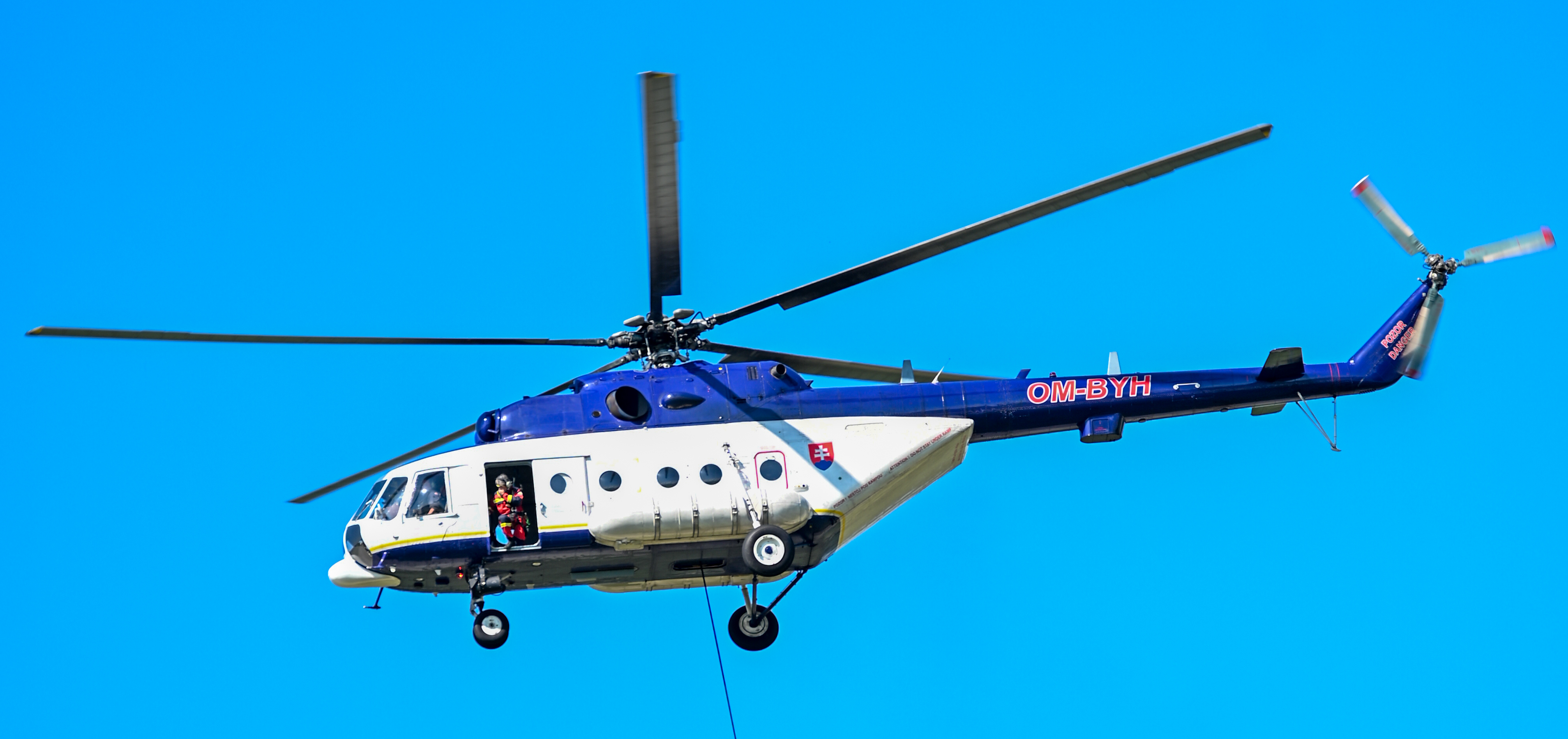
A Mil Mi-171C helicopter in service with Slovakia in 2021

Chinese built variant of Mi-171 by Sichuan Lantian Helicopter Company Limited, with two radars, one weather radar in the forward section, and another Doppler navigational radar under tail boom. Clam shell doors are replaced by a single ramp door.
Mi-171E
Mi-171 equipped with VK-2500-03 engines to operate in extreme temperature limits, from −58 to 50 Celsius.

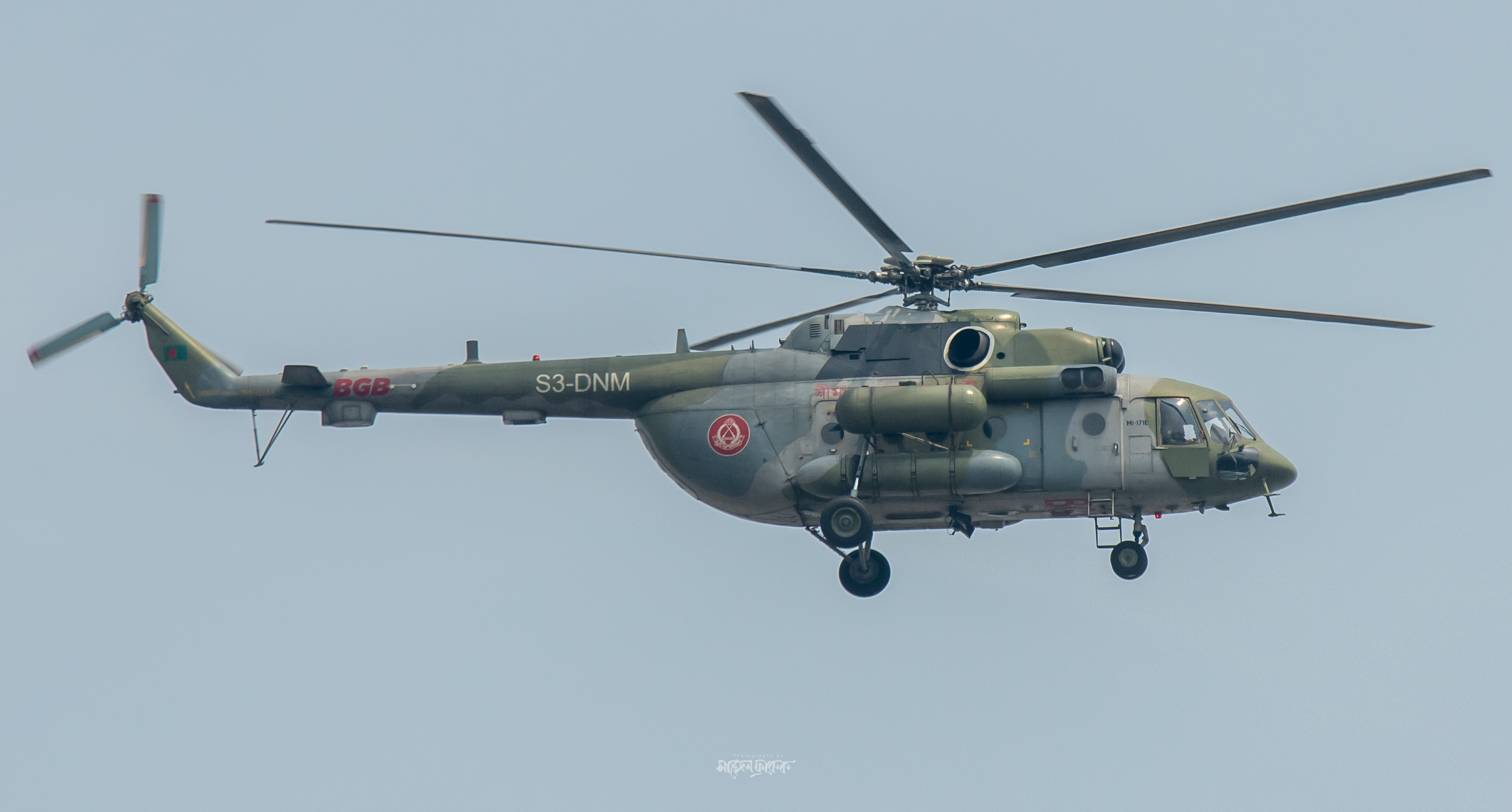
Mil Mi-171E of Border Guard Bangladesh

Mi-171M
Modernized Mi-171 to reduce crew from 3 to 2.

Mi-171S
Mi-171 with Western avionics such as AN/ARC-320 transceiver, GPS and standard NATO flight responder.

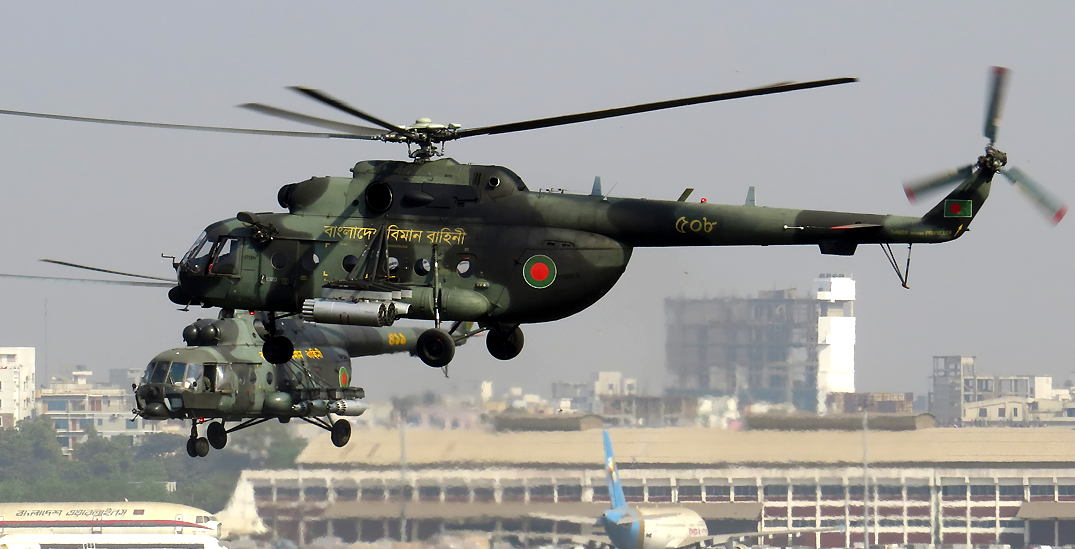
Bangladesh Air Force Mi-171sh helicopters armed with rocket and gun pods

Mi-171Sh
Export version of the Ulan-Udes Mi-8AMTSh. It is the most advanced export version and can be armed with various armaments. In addition to transporting troops, the helicopter can also be used to attack enemy positions. Mi-171SH-HV and Mi-171SH-VN are more advanced versions equipped with electro-optical FLIR system and armed with anti-tank guided missiles.

Czech Republic and Croatia have ordered these types in 2005 and 2007. Both Bangladesh Air Force and Bangladesh Army operates Mi-171Sh armed assault helicopter and for multirole operations. Two recent operators are Peru who ordered 6, all due for delivery in 2011, and Ghana which received 4 of the helicopters in January 2013. A new order from China in 2020.
Mi-171ShP
Export version of Mi-17Sh for Peruvian Army (Aviación del Ejército del Peru) who ordered 24 for US$528 million and the contract stipulates delivery of spare parts, ground support equipment, maintenance support, and the establishment of a Mi-17 maintenance facility in La Joya (Arequipa), for US$62.4 million
Mi-171Sh2
Upgraded version of Mi-171Sh for Algerian Air Force with new avionics, engines and optronic ball,"President-S" active and passive protection system, two B8W20A rocket pods, eight 9M120 Ataka missiles.
Mi-172
Civil passenger version manufactured in Kazan plant and based on the Mi-8MTV-3.
Mi-171Sh Storm for special forces

== Operators ==
- Afghanistan
- Algeria
- Angola
- Argentina
- Armenia
- Azerbaijan
- Bangladesh
- Bosnia and Herzegovina
- Bulgaria
- Burkina Faso
- Cambodia
- Chad
- China
- Colombia
- Congo
- DR Congo
- Croatia
- Cuba
- Czech Republic
- Djibouti
- Ecuador
- Egypt
- Eritrea
- Ethiopia
- Ghana
- Hungary
- India
  - SkyOne Airways, Delhi-based helicopter charter airline with MI-172s in fleet
- Indonesia
- Iran
- Iraq
- Kazakhstan
- Kenya
- Laos
- Malaysia
  - used by Fire and Rescue Department of Malaysia
- Mali
- Mexico
- Mongolia
- Montenegro
- Mozambique
- Myanmar
- Namibia
- Nepal
- Nicaragua
- Niger
- Nigeria
- North Korea
- North Macedonia
- Pakistan
- Papua New Guinea
- Peru
- Poland
- Russia
- Rwanda
- Senegal
- Serbia
- Sierra Leone
- Slovakia
- South Korea
- South Sudan
- Sri Lanka
- Syria
- Thailand
- Turkey – 19
- Turkmenistan
- Uganda
- Ukraine
- United Kingdom
- United States
- Uzbekistan
- Venezuela
- Vietnam
- Yemen

- (Houthis) Houthi rebels

- Zambia

=== Former operators ===
- Canada (Mi-8)
- Costa Rica
  - Air Vigilance Service: Received a Mi-17 (Mi-8MT) donated by Nicaragua in response to the 1991 Limon earthquake, but its operational status is doubtful due to lack of spare parts. It was then sold to Colombia.
- GDR
- Germany
- Czechoslovakia
- Latvia
- Lithuania
- Romania
- Soviet Union

== Accidents and notable incidents ==
- On 16 September 2000, a Mi-17 helicopter of the Sri Lanka Air Force crashed near Aranayake in Kegalle District, Sri Lanka with Minister of Shipping, Ports and Rehabilitation M. H. M. Ashraff on board. Besides the minister, there were 14 others on board – nine party officials, three bodyguards and two crew members. The authorities initially claimed that engine failure had caused the crash. The government immediately ordered an inquiry into the crash and in January 2001. President Kumaratunga appointed a Presidential Commission to inquire into the crash. However, neither found any conclusive evidence for the crash's cause.
- On 30 July 2005, a Mi-17 presidential helicopter crashed in mountain ranges in South Sudan due to poor visibility claiming the life of then President of South Sudan John Garang, six of his colleagues and seven Ugandan crew members. He was returning from a private visit in Rwakitura meeting President Yoweri Museveni of Uganda.
- On 12 January 2008, a Mi-17 of the Macedonian Armed Forces crashed, killing all three crew members and eight passengers.
- On 3 March 2008, an Iraqi Air Force Mi-17 (Mi-8AMT) crashed near Baiji while ferrying troops from Tal Afar to the capital Baghdad. All eight people on board perished in the accident.
- On 31 May 2008, a People's Liberation Army Mi-171 transport crashed in southwest Sichuan province, killing 5 crew and 13 passengers on board. It was on a rescue mission during the 2008 Sichuan earthquake.
- On 14 January 2009, an Afghan Air Force Mi-17 crashed in Herat while en route to Farah province. All 13 on board were killed, including Maj. Gen. Fazl Ahmad Sayar, one of Afghanistan's four regional commanders.
- On 3 May 2009 a Venezuelan Army Mi-17V-5 crashed in the state of Táchira killing all 17 people on board.
- On 3 July 2009, a Pakistani Mi-17 helicopter crashed near the Afghan border in Orakzai Agency, Federally-Administered Tribal Areas, killing 26 security personnel.
- On 14 February 2010, a Yemeni Air Force Mi-17 crashed in Northern Yemen, hitting an Army vehicle. All eleven people on board were killed, along with three others on the ground.
- On 28 July 2010, an Iraqi Air Force Mi-17 (Mi-8M) crashed in a sandstorm about 110 km south of Baghdad, killing all 5 occupants.
- On 19 November 2010, an Indian Air Force Mi-17 crashed near Tawang in Arunachal Pradesh, India killing all 12 people on board. It had taken off from Tawang for Guwahati, and crashed about five minutes later at Bomdila.
- On 19 April 2011, a Pawan Hans Mi-17 burst into flames seconds before landing at Tawang in Arunachal Pradesh, India, killing 17 people on board.
- On 18 May 2012, a Venezuelan Army Mi-17 crashed while in training in Yaracuy, Venezuela, killing 4 people.
- On 11 July 2012, a Pakistan Army Mi-17 crashed near Skardu Airport in Gilgit-Baltistan, killing 5 people.
- On 30 August 2012, two Indian Air Force Mi-17s collided near Jamnagar in Western India, killing 9 people.
- On 11 February 2013, a Mi-17 belonging to Azerbaijani Air Force crashed into the Caspian Sea killing all 3 people on board.
- On 20 June 2013, a Mi-17 of the Nicaraguan Air Force crashed into a lake near the Momotombo volcano and the El Papalonal firing range in La Paz Centro, resulting in the deaths of 10 high-ranking air force personnel.
- On 25 June 2013, a Mi-17V-5 of the Indian Air Force crashed while undertaking rescue operations in the flood-ravaged areas of the state of Uttarakhand in northern India. IAF chief NAK Browne ruled out possibility of any of the 20 men on board surviving. There were five staff from IAF, six from Indo-Tibetan Border Police (ITBP), and nine from National Disaster Response Force (NDRF).
- On 16 September 2013, a Turkish Air Force F-16 shot down a Syrian Mil-17 at the border after the helicopter violated Turkish airspace. Two crew members reportedly bailed out before the aircraft crashed in Syrian territory.
- On 9 November 2013, an Indonesian Army Mi-17 crash killed at least 13 people after the helicopter caught on fire in the jungles of Borneo.
- On 7 July 2014, a Vietnam People's Air Force Mi-171 military helicopter crashed on the outskirts of Hanoi while on a training mission for parachute recruits. Among 21 men on board, 16 died, 4 others died in hospitals, only 1 survived. The pilot crashed in a field, probably to avoid the local market and houses.
- On 10 July 2014, a Macedonian police Mi-17V-5 crashed overnight during a training flight near the southern town of Strumica, killing all four people on board. The four crew members were all pilots, each with more than 30 years of flight experience. They were on a night training flight when the Mi-17-V5 hit a 120-metre (390 ft) tall television transmitter tower near Strumica, about 190 kilometres (120 mi) south of the capital Skopje.
- On 13 March 2015, Serbian Army Mi-17 crashed just short of Belgrade airport when employed in transportation, from Novi Pazar to military medical facility in Belgrade, of a 5-day-old baby with respiratory problems due to road blockade by the landslide. All 7 individuals aboard, including four crew members, two medical staff and the patient died.
- On 8 May 2015, a Pakistan Army Mi-17 crashed near the Naltar area of Gilgit in Gilgit-Baltistan, killing the Norwegian and Philippine ambassadors and the wives of the Malaysian and Indonesian ambassadors. Two Pakistan Army pilots, Major Al-Tamash and Major Faisal, were also killed in the incident. The Polish and Dutch ambassadors were injured.
- On 13 May 2015, a Mi-17 helicopter on a training flight belonging to Bangladesh Air Force crash landed at the airport and caught fire. All three people on board sustained major injuries and were hospitalized.
- On 28 July 2015, a Mi-17 from the Presov Helicopter Airbase of the Slovak Air Force crashed into a forested area near Hradisko, Terňa, Slovakia during a routine training flight. The pilot died on the scene and the remaining two crew members sustained major injuries and were hospitalized.
- During the Russian intervention on the Syrian Civil War. Two Russian Mi-8AMTsh helicopters were sent to find and recover the pilots from the crash site of a Su-24M bomber downed. One of the helicopters was damaged by small-arms fire from Syrian Turkmen Brigade militants, resulting in the death of a naval infantryman, and was forced to make an emergency landing.
- On 29 February 2016, a Mi-17 of the Pakistan Army Aviation Corps crashed while on a routine training flight, killing Lt Col Tauqeer.
- On 27 March 2016, a Mi-17 of the Algerian Air Force crashed in Southern Algeria causing the death of 12 military personnel and two injured.
- On 4 August 2016, A Pakistani Mi-17 transport belonging to the Punjab government en route to Russia for repair, crashed in Logar Province, Afghanistan. The six people on board were reportedly taken as hostage by Taliban. The crew and occupants of the Mi-17 were released after ten days through an inter-tribe exchange at Pakistan-Afghan border. The crew consisted of five Pakistanis and one Russian.
- On 27 November 2016, an Iranian Mi-17 transport, operated by Yas Air, that was dispatched to an oil rig located 19 kilometres (12 mi) off the coast of Amirabad in the northern province of Mazandaran, crashed in the Caspian Sea. All five people on board died.
- On 31 December 2016, a Venezuelan Mi-17 transport of the Venezuelan Army covering the route SVPA – SVLE crashed in the Amazonas State.
- On 29 May 2017 a Mi-17 transport of the Sri Lanka Air Force which was engaged in flood relief operations was forced to land with extensive damage in Baddegama, and none of the crew members injured.
- On 6 October 2017, an Indian Air Force Mi-17V-5 crashed in Arunachal Pradesh killing 7 on board.
- On 3 January 2018, a Mil Mi-17 of Bangladesh Air Force crashed in Sreemangal whilst carrying Kuwaiti delegates. The Kuwaiti delegates have been identified as Kuwait Armed Forces Chief of Staff Lt Gen Mohammad Al-Khuder and Kuwait Naval Forces Commander Maj Gen Khalid Mahmud Abdullah. Everyone were rescued alive.

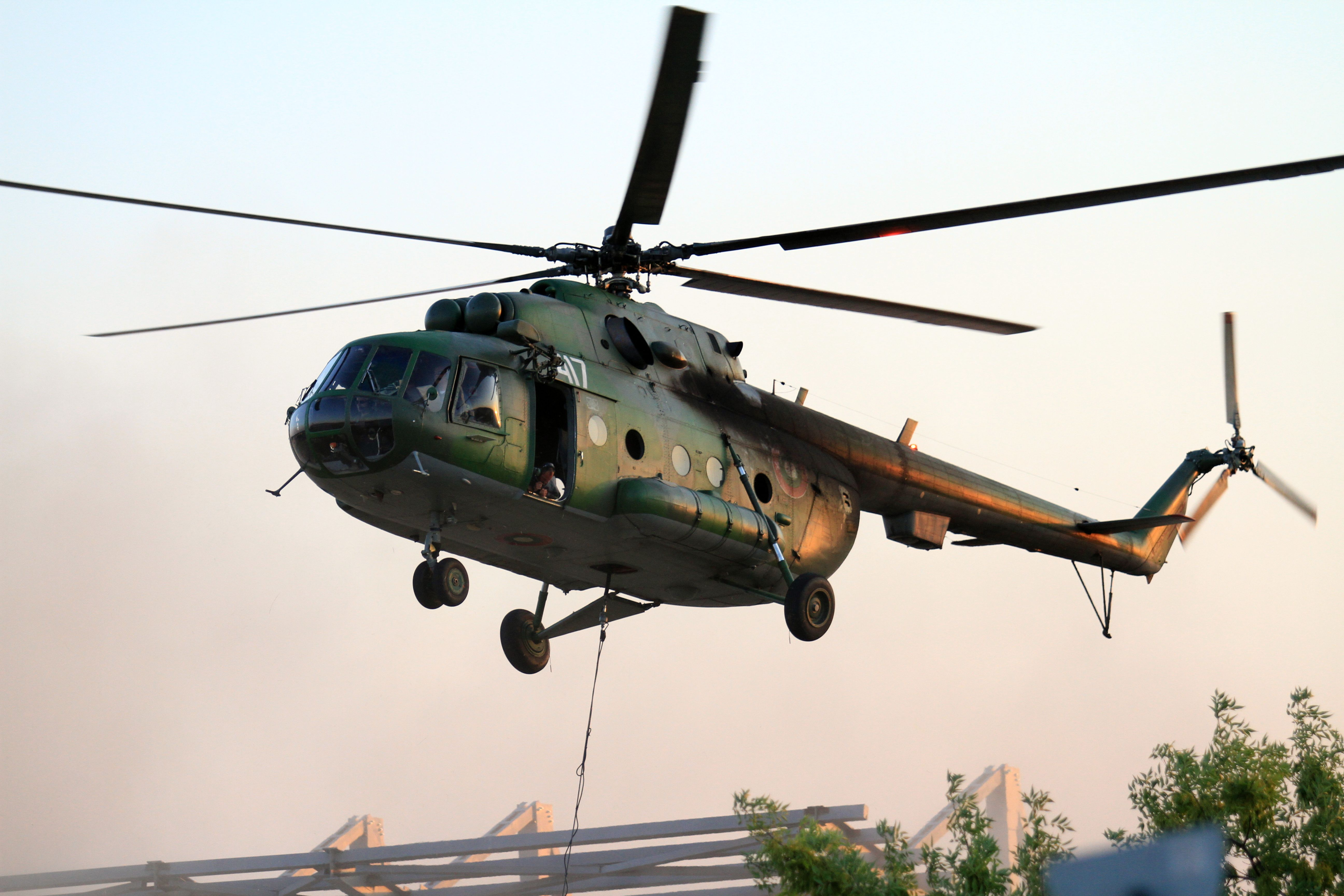
Bulgarian military Mi-17 during a firefighting mission. The Mi-17 in the photo crashed at Plovdiv Airport, Bulgaria on 11 June 2018.

- On 3 April 2018, an Mi-17 transport of the Indian Air Force crashed in Kedarnath. All the people on board survived. Indian Air Force has ordered an inquiry into the crash.
- On 11 June 2018, a Mi-17 of the Bulgarian Air Force crashed at Plovdiv Airport, Bulgaria, killing two on board.
- On 27 February 2019, a Mi-17 of the Indian Air Force crashed in Budgam, Jammu and Kashmir, killing six on board and one civilian on the ground. Locals on the ground claim that they had heard a huge explosion and saw the helicopter break into two parts before crash. Later investigation have shown that the helicopter was shot down as result of friendly fire when a SPYDER Indian air defense system fired a missile which hit the Mi-17, killing everyone aboard.
- On 13 May 2019, a People's Liberation Army Mi-171 transport belonging to the Tibet Military District crashed in Qinling in Shaanxi Province, killing 6 crew.
- On 8 January 2020, an Afghan National Army Mi-17 crashed shortly after takeoff in Gardiz, Paktia province. It was later destroyed on the ground by Afghan Security forces.
- On 11 February 2020, a Syrian Air Force Mi-17 utility helicopter was shot down by Turkish-backed rebel forces using an American designed MANPADS over Al-Nayrab, killing everyone aboard. A second Mi-17 of the Syrian Army was shot down in Idlib under similar circumstances, killing all crew, on 14 February 2020.
- On 6 March 2020, a Myanmar Air Force Mi-17 crashed shortly after takeoff near Kaungkha Village, Kutkai Township.
- On 6 June 2020, an Indonesian Army Mi-17 crashed in Kendal Regency, killing 4 on board and 5 personnels survived.
- On 7 July 2020, a Peruvian Air Force Mi-17-1V crashed in a river in the Amazonas. Seven occupants died in the crash; four crew members and three civilian passengers.
- On 13 October 2020, a pair of Afghan National Army Air Corps Mi-17s collided with one another in mid-air in the Nawa-i-Barakzayi district, Helmand province. 9 were killed.
- On 10 November 2020, a Mi-17 of the Afghan National Army Air Corps crashed on takeoff at Hisarak district, Nangarhar province.
- On 18 March 2021, a Mi-17 helicopter of the Afghan Army was shot down by a local anti-taliban militia led by ethnic warlord Abdul Ghani Alipur in the Behsud district of Maidan Wardak. Nine members of the Afghan security forces died in the incident.
- On 24 June 2021, a Kenyan military aircraft identified as a Mi-17 crashed in Kajiado county and went up in flames.
- On 25 August 2021, a Mi-17 of the Mexican Navy crashed in Agua Blanca de Iturbide. Four people injured were reported.
- On 30 November 2021, a Mi-17 of the State Border Service of Azerbaijan crashed in Khizi District causing the death of 14 military personnel and injuring 2 occupants.
- On 8 December 2021, an Indian Air Force Mi-17V-5 carrying 13 defence personnel including Chief of Defence Staff General Bipin Rawat and his wife, Madhulika Rawat, crashed near Coonoor, Tamil Nadu while flying towards Wellington from Sulur Air Force Station. 13 of the 14 on board died in the crash, including General Bipin Rawat and his spouse. The sole survivor of the crash, Group Captain Varun Singh died from his injuries seven days later.
- On 26 April 2022, a Mi-17-1V of the Mexican Navy crashed in Mazatlán. Five marines injured were reported.
- On 16 June 2022, an Afghan Air Force Mi-17 was shot down by NRF fighters in Panjshir Province, killing two Taliban fighters. Four crew members were taken prisoner.
- On 12 January 2024, a Sri Lanka Air Force Mi-17 helicopter, deployed for UN peacekeeping operations in the Central African Republic as part of MINUSCA, crash-landed northeast of Bria due to adverse weather conditions. The pilot and the four crew members emerged unharmed from the incident.
- On 7 February 2024, an Algerian Air Force Mi-171 crashed near El Menia, killing all 3 crew.
- On 29 April 2024, a Colombian Army Mi-17 crashed in Northern Colombia while carrying troops, killing all 9 on board.
- In May 2025 footage appeared suggesting that a Mi-17 had been shot down by a FPV drone in the context of the Myanmar civil war (2021–present).
- On 15 August 2025, a Mi-17 helicopter carrying relief supplies crashed, killing five crew members, including two pilots, in the northwestern Pakistani province of Khyber Pakhtunkhwa. The Mi-17 helicopter of the provincial government was carrying relief supplies to areas affected by heavy rains when it crashed "due to bad weather," said the provincial chief minister, Ali Amin Gandapur.
- On 1 September 2025, a Mi-17 of the Pakistan Army crashed in Diamer District's Chilas town in Pakistan administered Gilgit-Baltistan killing all 5 crew members including 2 pilots. According to ISPR, the crash was due to an technical fault.
- On 22 February 2026, a Mil Mi-17 operated by the Peruvian Air Force was destroyed after it impacted terrain. All four crew members and eleven passengers were killed.
- On 10 June 2026, a Pakistan Army Aviation Corps Mil Mi-17 helicopter crashed near Muzaffarabad, Azad Kashmir, shortly after take-off due to a reported technical fault. All 22 occupants on board were killed.
- On 12 August 2026, a Mexican Navy Mil Mi-17 had an emergency landing in the municipality of La Garita, Jalisco. 3 members of the navy suffered injuries.
- On 4 November 2026, an Indonesian Army Mil Mi-17V5 crashed in Central Kalimantan, Indonesia, attempt to get water for water-bombing mission to extinguish wild forest and land fires. 5 members crew under treatment and 3 others lost or killed in action.

== Specifications (Mil-171A2) ==
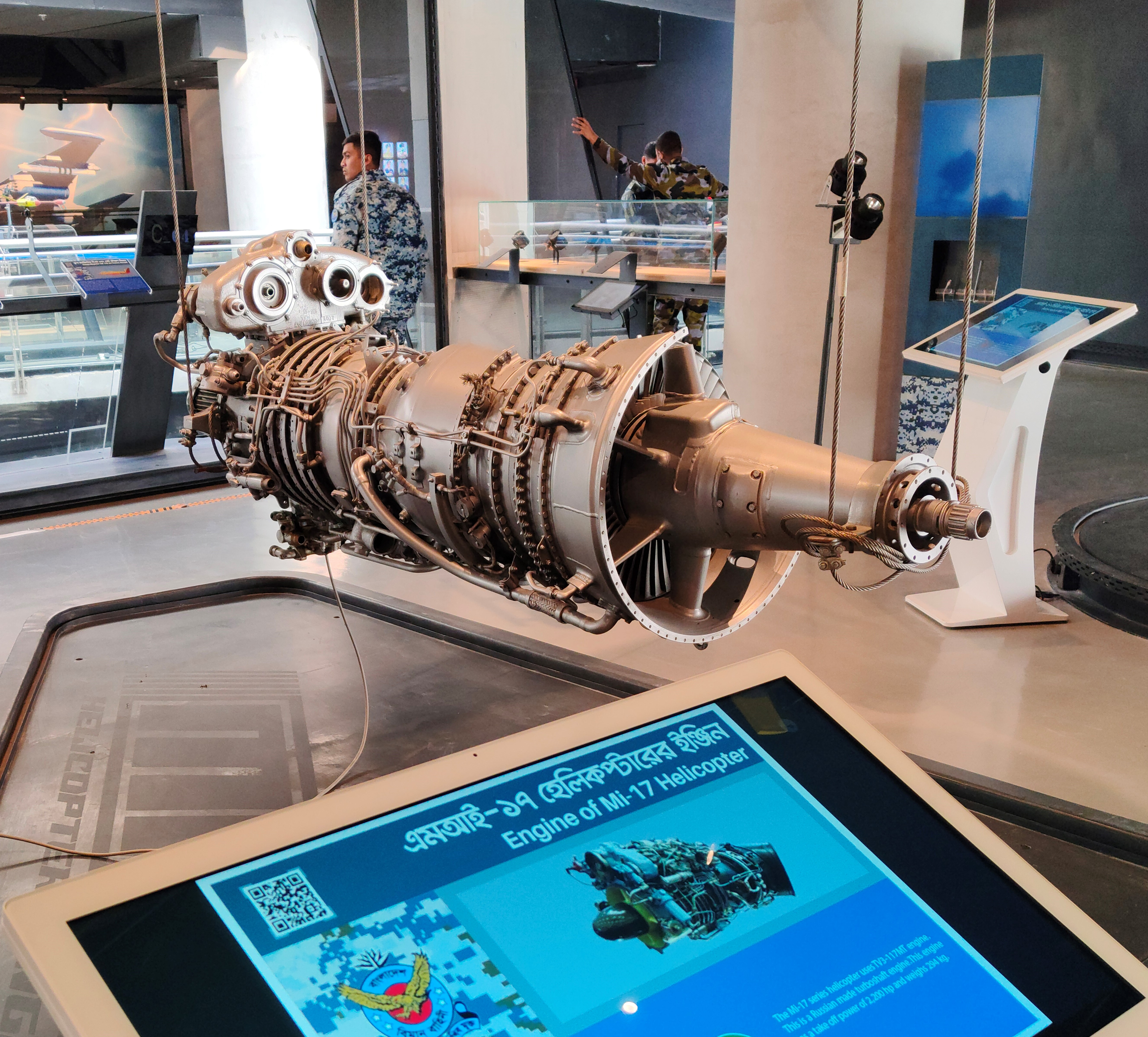
Klimov VK-2500PS-03 on display at Bangladesh Military Museum, Bangladesh

Data from Russian Helicopters

General characteristics

- Crew: 3 (pilot, copilot, engineer)
- Capacity: 24 troops / 12 stretchers / 4,000 kg (8,818 lb) cargo internally / 5,000 kg (11,023 lb) externally slung.
- Length: 18.465 m (60 ft 7 in)
- Height: 5.65 m (18 ft 6 in)
- Empty weight: 7,489 kg (16,510 lb)
- Gross weight: 11,100 kg (24,471 lb)
- Max takeoff weight: 13,000 kg (28,660 lb) normal

13,500 kg (29,762 lb) with under-slung load

- Powerplant: 2 × Klimov VK-2500PS-03 turboshaft engines, 1,800 kW (2,400 hp) each for takeoff

2,000 kW (2,700 hp) emergency rating

- Main rotor diameter: 21.25 m (69 ft 9 in)
- Main rotor area: 354.7 m^{2} (3,818 sq ft) *Blade section: NACA 23012

Performance

- Maximum speed: 280 km/h (170 mph, 150 kn)
- Cruise speed: 260 km/h (160 mph, 140 kn)
- Range: 800 km (500 mi, 430 nmi)
- Service ceiling: 6,000 m (20,000 ft) *Hover ceiling OGE: 4,000 m (13,000 ft)
- Rate of climb: 8 m/s (1,600 ft/min)

Armament

- Some variants such as Mi-8AMTSh and Mi-171Sh have disposable stores on six hardpoints, including rockets such as S-8 and gun pods such as UPK-23-250. Some variants such as Mi-171SH-HV and Mi-171SH-VN can be armed with anti-tank guided missiles such as Ataka and precision-guided munitions along with other armaments. Have one or two window-mounted machine guns such as the PK.
- Other: hardpoints which can carry drop tanks, to increase the range, or up to 4,000 kg (8,800 lb) of bombs.

== See also ==
- Utility helicopter

Related development

- Mil Mi-8
- Mil Mi-14
- Mil Mi-38

Aircraft of comparable role, configuration, and era

- Aérospatiale SA 321 Super Frelon
- AgustaWestland AW101
- Bell 412
- Bell CH-146 Griffon
- Bell UH-1Y Venom
- Eurocopter AS532 Cougar
- Eurocopter EC725
- Eurocopter AS332 Super Puma
- NHIndustries NH90
- Sikorsky UH-60 Black Hawk
