= The Institute for Health Care of Mother and Child of Serbia "Dr. Vukan Čupić" =

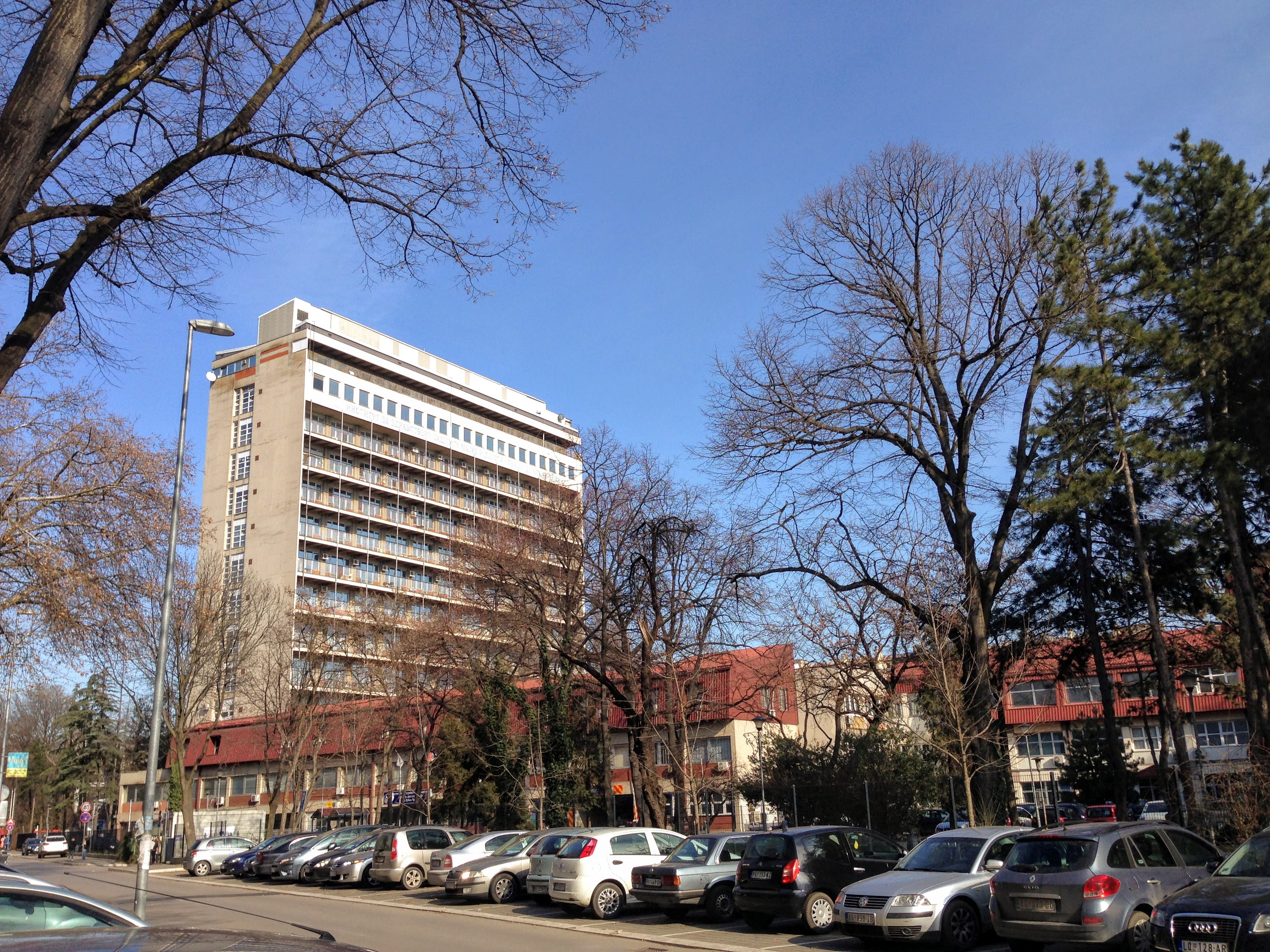
The Institute for Health Care of Mother and Child of Serbia Dr. Vukan Čupić

The Institute for Health Care of Mother and Child of Serbia Dr. Vukan Čupić is a healthcare center in Belgrade, within the municipal territory of Novi Beograd. It represents one of the largest and most significant pediatric hospitals in the region. It was founded by a decree of the Government of the People's Republic of Serbia (then part of FNR Yugoslavia) in 1950, with the aim of organizing and developing a national network of healthcare institutions for women of reproductive age, preschool, and school children.

== General Information ==
The Institute for Health Care of Mother and Child of Serbia Dr. Vukan Čupić was established by a decree from the Government of the People's Republic of Serbia in 1950. Its purpose was to organize and develop a national network of healthcare institutions for women of reproductive age, preschool, and school children.

In 1993 and 1995, by the decision of the Ministry of Health of the Republic of Serbia, the Institute became a national reference institution for the health care of women of reproductive age, preschool, and school children.

The Institute is named after Vukan Čupić, a Serbian physician and long-term director of the institution.

== Institute structure ==
The Institute consists of seven organizational units:

1. Pediatric Clinic
2. Clinic for Pediatric Surgery
3. Human Reproduction Service
4. National Center for Family Planning
5. Service for Scientific Research and Educational Activities
6. Service for Organization, Planning, Evaluation, and Medical Informatics
7. Service for Non-Medical Affairs

The Institute has been located at its current site since 1974. It serves as a teaching base for the Faculty of Medicine in Belgrade for future general practitioners, pediatricians, pediatric surgeons, gynecologists, and anesthesiologists. The head of the Institute's Ethics Committee is Dr. Katarina Sedlecki, a gynecologist-obstetrician from the National Center for Family Planning.

The head of the Institute's Management Board is Dr. Dušan Jovanović, a surgeon from the Urgent Surgery Clinic of the Clinical Center of Serbia. The head of the Institute's Supervisory Board is Miloš Čavić, a lawyer from the Legal, Personnel, and General Affairs Service.

The Director of the Institute is Assoc. Prof. Dr. Radoje Simić, a pediatric surgeon. He is also the head of the Department of Plastic and Reconstructive Surgery and Burns. The Deputy Director of the Institute is Prof. Dr. Vladislav Vukomanović, a pediatrician and cardiologist, head of the Pediatric Clinic and the Department for Invasive Diagnosis and Interventional Cardiology with the Department for the Examination and Treatment of Heart and Blood Vessel Diseases.

== Donations and support ==
- In 2015 the late couple Đuro and Ilinka Trifunović from Canada left one million Canadian dollars to the Institute by testament. This significant donation was used to renovate three departments in the Institute, including the reconstruction of laboratories for metabolic disorders, microbiology, and pathology.
- In 2015 the Ministry of Health of Serbia invested seven and a half million dinars in the reconstruction of the hematology-oncology department, providing additional support to the Institute.
- The Meridian Foundation From the Heart with Love has been paying significant attention to the Institute for Mother and Child for years, especially during March 8 campaigns. According to Stefan Glavaš, a representative of the Meridian Foundation, the goal of this tradition is to provide continuous support to the Institute and assist in its smooth functioning. In 2024, the Foundation donated air purifiers and climate control devices for several departments of the hospital. Additionally, the Institute was visited by Vaso Bakochević and Crvena zvezda basketball player Trey Tompkins.
- In 2023 DM Serbia donated medical equipment worth 13,635,695.19 dinars to the Institute. The donation includes diagnostic and treatment devices, as well as climate control units to improve conditions for patients and staff.
- In 2024 Laguna, as part of its 25th-anniversary celebrations, redirected funds intended for the jubilee celebration to humanitarian purposes. In collaboration with the NORBS Plus Foundation, a polysomnograph was purchased for the Institute. This device is crucial for diagnosing sleep-disordered breathing.
- Đorđe Mitrović, a young writer and person with a disability, organized a humanitarian campaign in collaboration with the Human Heart Foundation to collect equipment for the Institute for Health Care of Mother and Child of Serbia "Dr. Vukan Čupić." The value of the donation was 420,000 dinars. Đorđe raised 140,000 dinars from the sale of his first book Wooden Dolls, while the remaining funds were collected by his friends from Prokuplje. Medical equipment, including wheelchairs, instruments, backpacks, and first aid supplies, was purchased with the funds.
