= Guimbal Cabri G5 =

2026 French light helicopter

Cabri G5
- Cabri G5

General information
- Type: Light helicopter
- National origin: France
- Manufacturer: Hélicoptères Guimbal
- Designer: Bruno Guimbal
- Status: In development

The Guimbal Cabri G5 is an under-development five-seat light helicopter being designed by the French rotorcraft manufacturer Hélicoptères Guimbal.

== Design and development ==
Development of the G5 commenced during the early 2020s; early work on the project was performed discreetly. A major impetus for the development was persistent customer interest in a larger variant of Hélicoptères Guimbal's first helicopter, the Cabri G2, as well as the firm's own desire to develop its own family of rotorcraft. The company conceptualised a new multi-mission helicopter that was targeted towards a perceived gap in the market between the smaller Cabri G2 and the larger Airbus Helicopters H125. While sharing some design features with the G-2, the G5 is a clean-sheet design. Furthermore, the designers observed that, while operators were primarily interested in safety, noise concerns were the main concern for other stakeholders, hence, a stated objective of the G5 was to minimise the noise generated to the level that it will be the quietest helicopter in its class.

In March 2026, Hélicoptères Guimbal announced the existence of the G-5 programme; by the time of this announcement, the rotorcraft's design had already been frozen and eight tonnes of production tooling had been produced. Furthermore, the firm was actively negotiating with prospective component suppliers. While the company has not voiced any expectations of development milestones, such as type certification, the company's CEO, Bruno Guimbal, stated that he would be pleased if the G5 were to enter service during 2030.

In terms of its general configuration, the G5 is a light helicopter designed to seat up to five occupants within a modular interior. Its seating arrangement has been designed to be reconfigurable; it has been envisioned that prospective military and VIP operations would make use of a four-seat configuration. Its cabin, while externally smaller than that of the Eurocopter EC120, maintains near-identical internal dimensions to this established competitor. It can be piloted from either of the front seats. The avionics are typically based on, and compatible with, the multiple configurations that had been already developed for the G2.

The airframe of the G5 is primarily composed of composites, and it is outfitted with the same crashworthy fuel system as the G2. The dynamic systems include a four-bladed main rotor that is to be furnished with high-aspect-ratio composite rotor blades, which have been attributed as helping to achieve greater ride quality and noise mitigation. Akin to the G2, the G5 is equipped with a fenestron enclosed tail rotor. The G5 is to be powered by an internally installed Safran Arrius 2D turboshaft engine, which is capable of generating up to 450 shp and is equipped with a dual-channel full authority digital engine control (FADEC) system; the latter feature is intended to reduce the pilot's workload. The use of the Arrius engine on the G5 made it Guimbal Cabri's first turbine-powered helicopter.

== See also ==
Related development

- Guimbal Cabri G2

Aircraft of comparable role, configuration, and era

- Eurocopter EC120

Related lists

- List of rotorcraft
