= Hélicoptères Guimbal =

French helicopter manufacturer

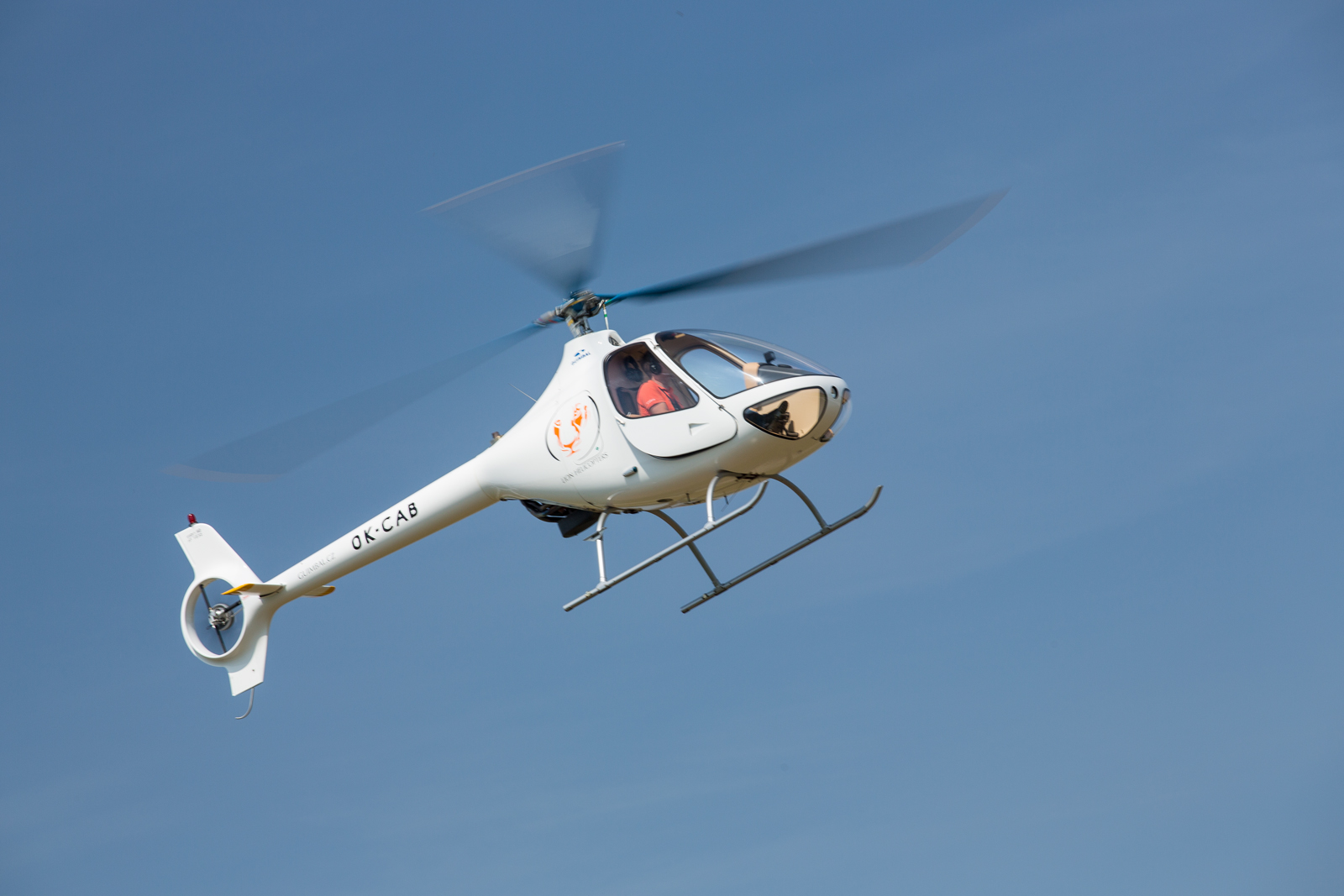
- An image of Guimbal Cabri G2 flying
- Industry: Aerospace
- Founded: 2000 (26 years ago)
- Headquarters: Marseille Provence Airport; Marignane, France
- Products: Helicopters
- Website: guimbal.com

Hélicoptères Guimbal is a French helicopter manufacturing company. The company produces the Guimbal Cabri G2.

== History ==
While working at Eurocopter on the Eurocopter AS365 Dauphin and Eurocopter EC120 Colibri helicopters during the 1980s, Bruno Guimbal decided to independently pursue the development of a two-seat reciprocating engine helicopter, which became the Guimbal Cabri G2. This rotorcraft would incorporate numerous safety-related and general technological advances commonly applied to larger turbine-powered rotorcraft, but typically absent from reciprocating-engine helicopters. These technologies included Eurocopter's Fenestron anti-torque shrouded tail rotor and Spheriflex main rotor, in addition to a composite fuselage.

During the early 1990s, Eurocopter elected to sponsor the program, as well as providing technical assistance during testing. In April 1992, the first prototype Cabri G2-01 conducted its maiden flight, which lasted for a total of 45 minutes. In 1996, this prototype set a world record. In 2000, Bruno Guimbal left Eurocopter to establish a new company, Hélicoptères Guimbal, in order to certify the Cabri G2 and to place the type into commercial production. To this end, research and production facilities were set up in Aix-en-Provence Aerodrome, France.

It had originally been hoped to have the Cabri certified in 2003. In March 2005, the first production Cabri performed its first flight. Following a six-year development program and 300 hours of flight testing, the Cabri G2 received type certification from the European Aviation Safety Agency (EASA) in December 2007. The granting of EASA certification made the Cabri the first twin-seat reciprocating-engine helicopter to be certified in more than 30 years. On 19 September 2008, the first production Cabri was officially delivered to iXAir, a French training operator, during a ceremony at Aix-en-Provence Aerodrome; this rotorcraft was the first of an order of ten.

In September 2008, production was reported to have been planned to ramp up to one a month throughout 2009, rising to two a month in 2010. In 2014, a total of 28 Cabri rotorcraft had been produced and, following a phase of manufacturing expansion, 44 Cabris were delivered in 2015 and 56 projected for 2016. It is intended for lead times between the receipt of an order and deliveries to be less than 12 months.

Guimbal did not initially pursue sales in the North American market, having instead chosen to wait for demand from suitable customers to emerge and FAA approval. In February 2015, the Cabri G2 received type certification from the Federal Aviation Administration (FAA), clearing the way for operations within the United States. By February 2016, the Cabri had received certification in 24 countries.

Beginning in 2003, Eurocopter and Hélicoptères Guimbal cooperated on the development of the Orka 1200, a vertical take-off and landing unmanned aerial vehicle (UAV) intended for military use. In June 2005, Eurocopter and Hélicoptères Guimbal formed a joint venture, known as Vertivision, to develop, market and produce unmanned variants of the Cabri G2, including prospective commercially oriented models. These UAVs reportedly make use of an advanced autopilot system, derived from the Eurocopter EC725; alternative powerplants are also under consideration.

The Airbus Helicopters VSR700 naval UAV, powered by a 155-hp Continental CD-155, will fly as a prototype in 2018 before a 2021 introduction.

== Products ==
- Guimbal Cabri G2 - twin-seat helicopter
- Guimbal Cabri G5 - four seat helicopter
- Airbus Helicopters VSR700 - UAV variant of the Cabri, designed in cooperation with Airbus Helicopters
