= Guimbal Cabri G2 =

2009 French light helicopter

Cabri G2
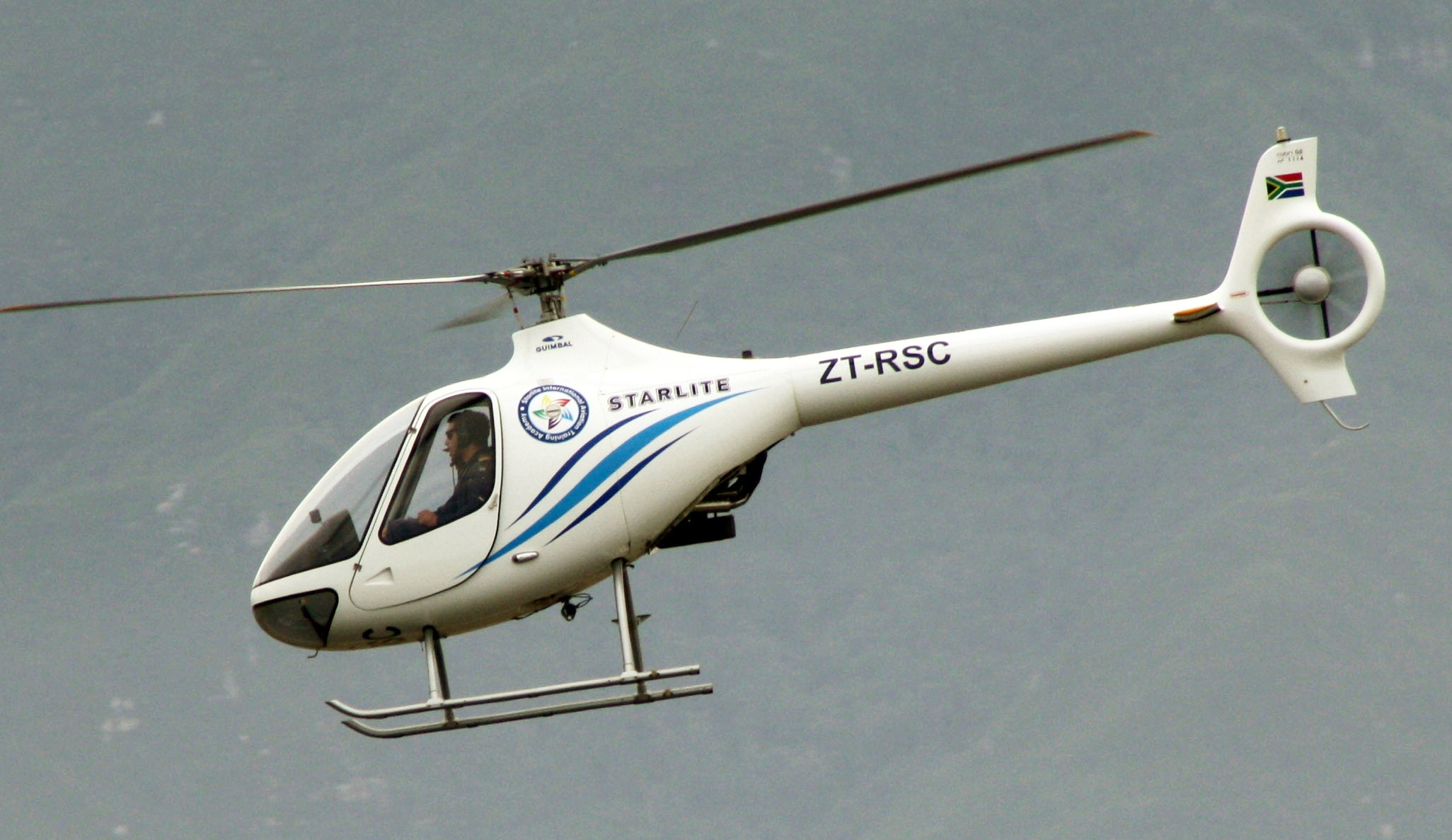
- Cabri G2

General information
- Type: Light helicopter
- National origin: France
- Manufacturer: Hélicoptères Guimbal
- Designer: Bruno Guimbal
- Status: In production
- Number built: 300 (July 2022)

History
- Introduction date: 2008
- First flight: 31 March 2005
- Developed into: Airbus Helicopters VSR700

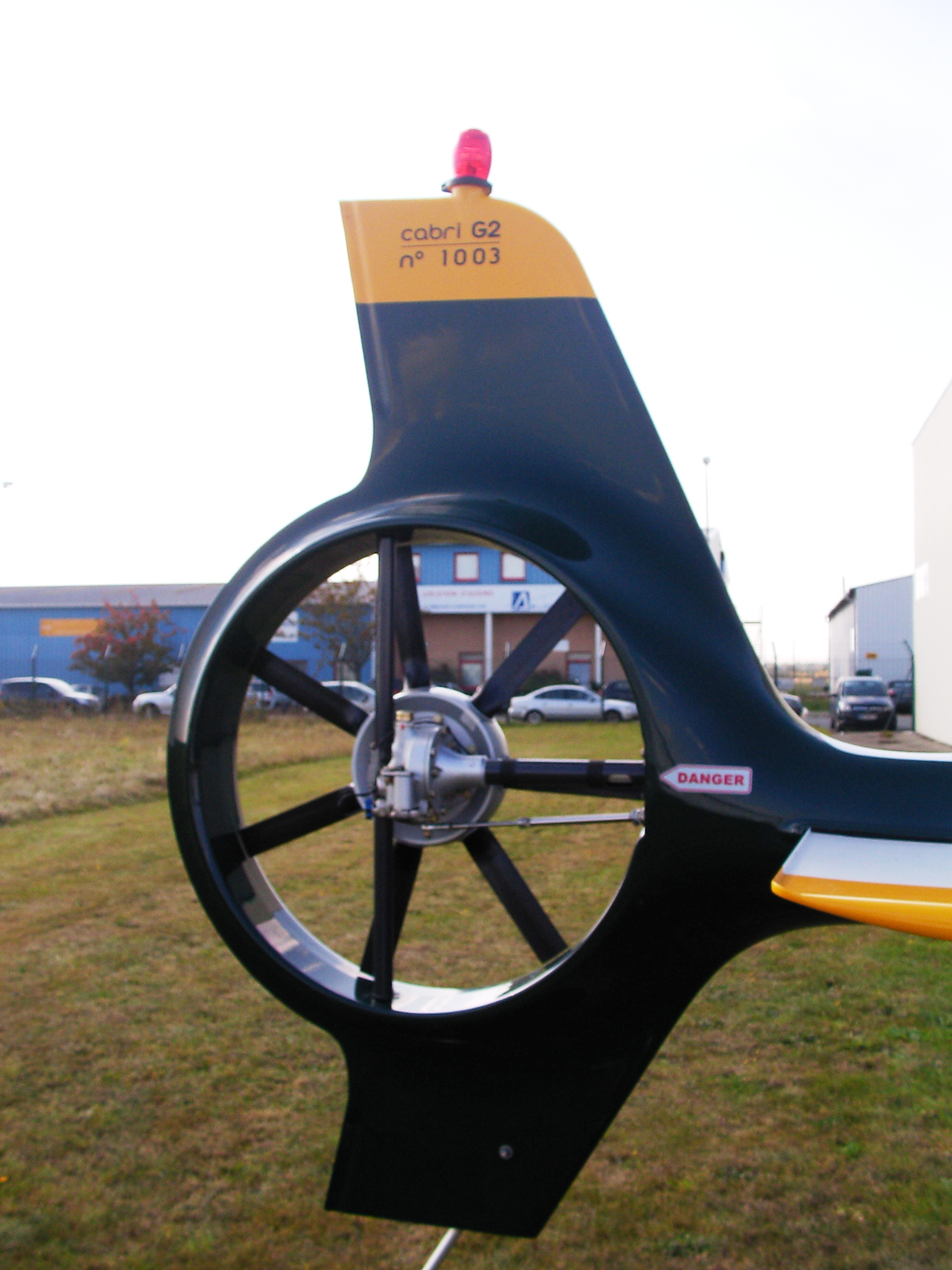
Cabri Fenestron tail rotor

The Guimbal Cabri G2 is a two-seat light helicopter produced by Hélicoptères Guimbal, and powered by a reciprocating engine. Designed by Bruno Guimbal, a former Eurocopter engineer, it had its origins in the 1980s, and the first demonstrator flew in 1992. Following the granting of regulatory approval, the Cabri entered commercial service in 2008. In addition to its use within the general aviation sector and as a training rotorcraft, the Cabri G2 has also been used as the basis for unmanned aerial vehicles (UAVs).

== Development ==
While working at Eurocopter on the Eurocopter AS365 Dauphin and Eurocopter EC120 Colibri helicopters during the 1980s, Bruno Guimbal decided to independently pursue the development of a two-seat reciprocating engine helicopter. This rotorcraft would incorporate numerous safety-related and general technological advances commonly applied to larger turbine-powered rotorcraft, but typically absent from reciprocating-engine helicopters. These technologies included Eurocopter's Fenestron anti-torque shrouded tail rotor and Spheriflex main rotor, in addition to a composite fuselage.

During the early 1990s, Eurocopter elected to sponsor the program, as well as providing technical assistance during testing. In April 1992, the first prototype Cabri G2-01 conducted its maiden flight, which lasted for a total of 45 minutes. In 1996, this prototype set a world record distance for a helicopter under 500 kg, with a distance of 481.32 km. In 2000, Bruno Guimbal left Eurocopter to establish a new company, Hélicoptères Guimbal, in order to certify the Cabri G2 and to place the type into commercial production. To this end, research and production facilities were set up in Aix-en-Provence Aerodrome, France.

It had originally been hoped to have the Cabri certified in 2003. In March 2005, the first production Cabri performed its first flight. Following a six-year development program and 300 hours of flight testing, the Cabri G2 received type certification from the European Aviation Safety Agency (EASA) in December 2007. The granting of EASA certification made the Cabri the first twin-seat reciprocating-engine helicopter to be certified in more than 30 years.

In September 2008, production was reported to have been planned to ramp up to one a month throughout 2009, rising to two a month in 2010. In 2014, a total of 28 Cabri rotorcraft had been produced and, following a phase of manufacturing expansion, 44 Cabris were delivered in 2015 and 56 projected for 2016. It is intended for lead times between the receipt of an order and deliveries to be less than 12 months.

Guimbal did not initially pursue sales in the North American market, having instead chosen to wait for demand from suitable customers to emerge and FAA approval. In February 2015, the Cabri G2 received type certification from the Federal Aviation Administration (FAA), clearing the way for operations within the United States. By February 2016, the Cabri had received certification in 24 countries.

=== Unmanned aerial vehicle ===
Beginning in 2003, Eurocopter and Hélicoptères Guimbal cooperated on the development of the Orka 1200, a vertical take-off and landing unmanned aerial vehicle (UAV) intended for military use. In June 2005, Eurocopter and Hélicoptères Guimbal formed a joint venture, known as Vertivision, to develop, market and produce unmanned variants of the Cabri G2, including prospective commercially oriented models. These UAVs reportedly make use of an advanced autopilot system, derived from the Eurocopter EC725; alternative powerplants are also under consideration.

The Airbus Helicopters VSR700 naval UAV, powered by a 155-hp Continental CD-155, will fly as a prototype in 2018 before a 2021 introduction.

== Design ==
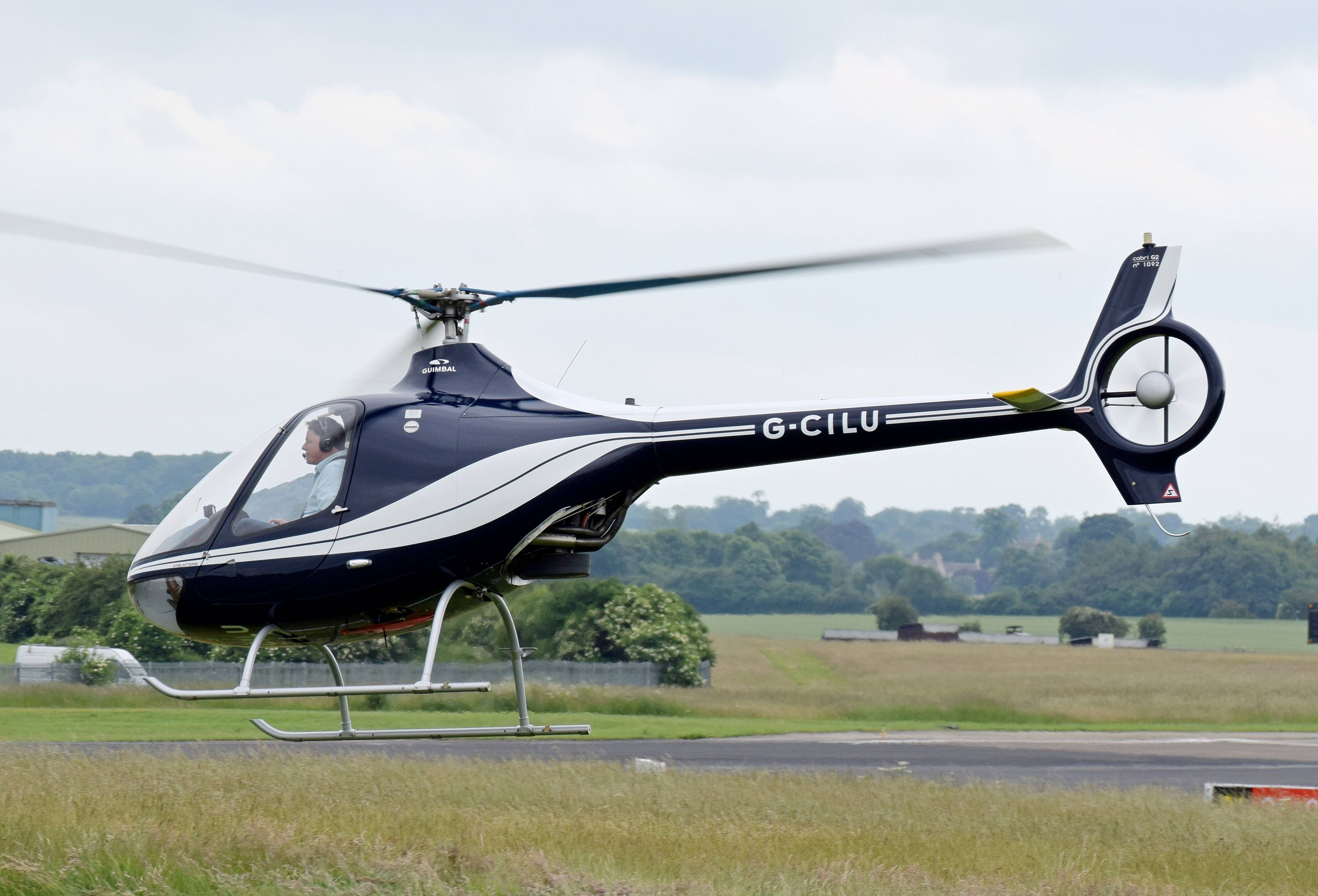
Guimbal Cabri G2 at Cotswold Airport, Gloucestershire, England, 2016

The Cabri G2 is a two-seat light helicopter with a three-bladed fully articulated main rotor and a Fenestron-type tail rotor with the main rotor blades advancing in a clockwise direction. The main rotor is designed to enable flight within a wide envelope of weather conditions, while the composite rotor blades are damage-tolerant and have no set life span. The use of the Fenestron has been credited as having made the Cabri noticeably quieter than competing rotorcraft, such as the Sikorsky S-300, in addition to its favourable safety, handling, and maneuverability attributes. The Cabri uses a skid landing gear arrangement; unusually, the skids are attached to the fuselage by elastomeric mounts rather than being directly bolted on to reduce ground resonance and provide greater articulation. The fuselage features a damage-resistant all-composite monocoque construction, reducing weight and maintenance requirements while increasing strength.

The Cabri employs a side-by-side seating arrangement for a pilot and passenger, which is also ideal for training purposes, which is an intended role for the type. Dual flight controls are typically installed; these can be removed without the aid of tools as required. The passenger seat on the left can be removed if unnecessary or for greater storage space within the cabin. Various features for personal helicopter usage, such as an externally accessible 200-litre baggage compartment, power sockets within the main cabin, leather seating, and incidental under-seat storage, are also present. An unusual feature of the Cabri is a remote door locking system, which includes an immobilizer function; this has been reported as being a world-first. The Cabri is also the first light helicopter to feature a plasma ignition system, the first with a glass cockpit, and the first to be certified under EASA CS-27 regulations. Available options include air conditioning, various avionics configurations, moving map display, Global Positioning System display, cargo hook, automatically deployed floatation gear, and several maintenance tooling packages.

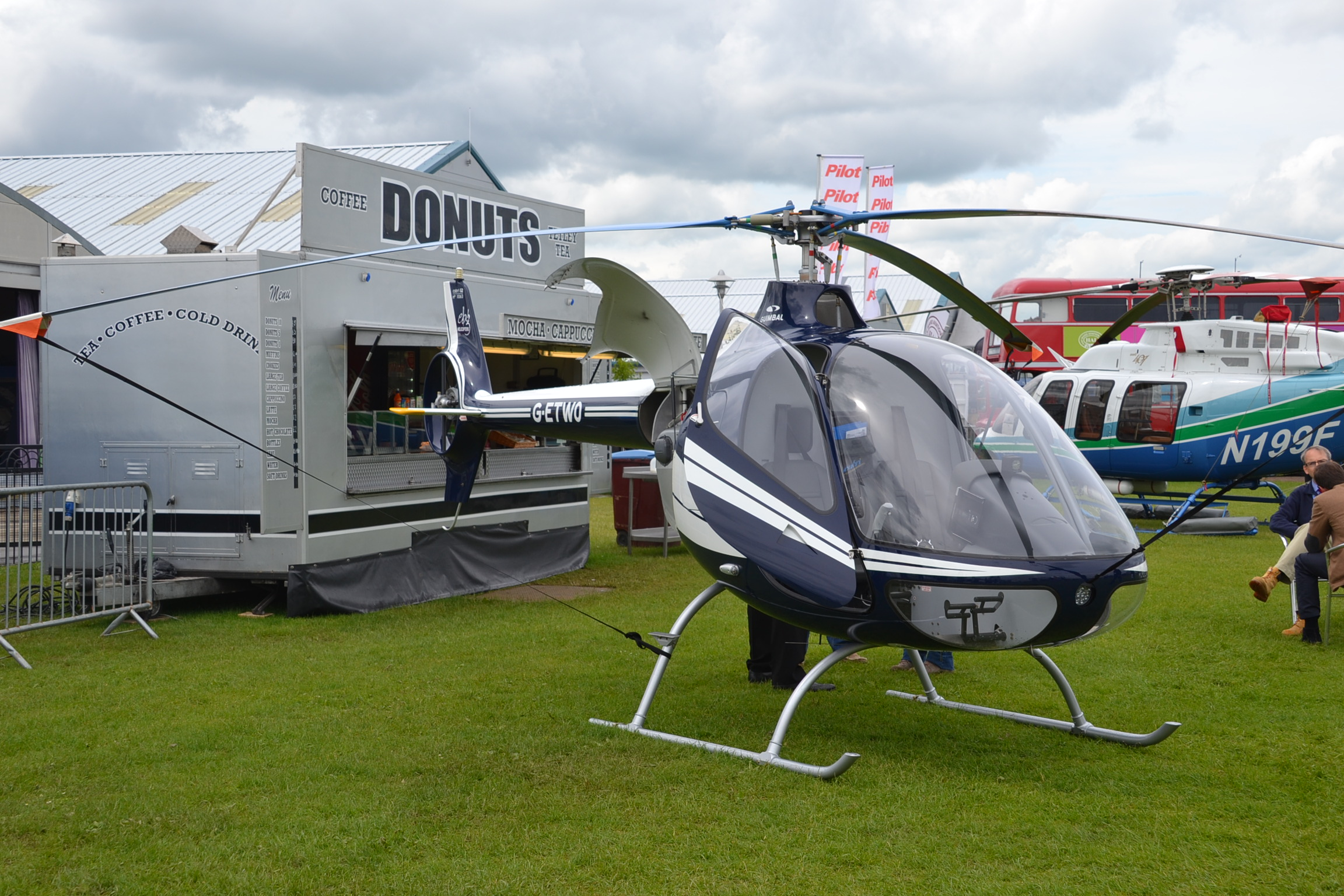
A Cabri G2 on static display, 2014

The Cabri is powered by a single 180 hp (134 kW) Lycoming O-360 piston engine, which has been rated to 145 hp (108 kW) max continuous power and 160 hp (119 kW) 5-minute power. The engine incorporates a solid-state electronic ignition system which protects against over-speed upon startup and has greater reliability. The engine mounts also utilize vibration isolation techniques for increased crew comfort. The engine is positioned directly behind the cabin, making it easier to access for maintenance; while the engine exhaust is elevated above the tail boom in order to reduce noise and lower the risk of ground fires upon landing. The maintenance costs of the Cabri are claimed to be "very low", in part due to only three components on the rotorcraft being time-limited, all others being condition-limited instead. The cost per overhaul of the Cabri is half of that of comparable rotorcraft such as the Robinson R22.

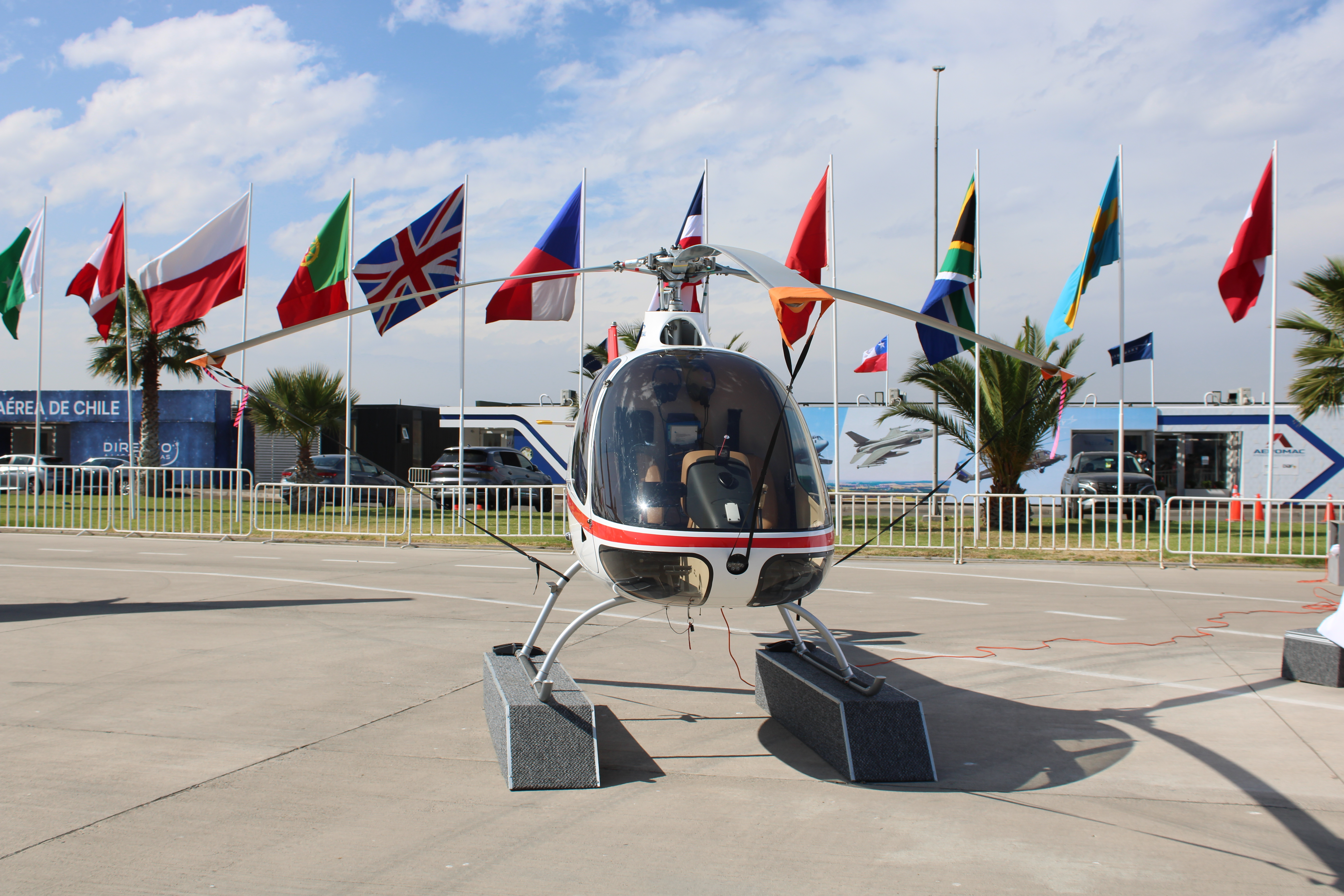
Front view of the Guimbal Cabri G2

At the core of the Cabri's avionics is the Electronic Pilot Management (EPM) system, the digital instrumentation of the aircraft's glass cockpit. Intended to be intuitive, the EPM uses three monitors to display critical aircraft and engine information, such as current power settings, engine/rotor speed, fuel level, flight time, and sensor data. In the event of an EPM system failure, backup systems are present. Guimbal claims the Cabri G2 to be "the only piston helicopter designed from scratch with the safety of its occupants as top priority." As such, numerous safety features are present upon the aircraft, including the design of the main rotor, a crash-worthy design, four-way trim system, energy-absorbent structure/seats, automatic carburetor ice-protection system, crash-resistant fuel tank, and exceptional autorotation capabilities. During development, the safety, security, longevity aspects of the design were emphasized over the cost. The Cabri G2 is one of only a handful of helicopters that fully complies with the FAA's crash-resistant fuel system (CRFS) safety standards of the Federal Aviation Regulations and is the only piston engine helicopter that made this list.

== Operational history ==
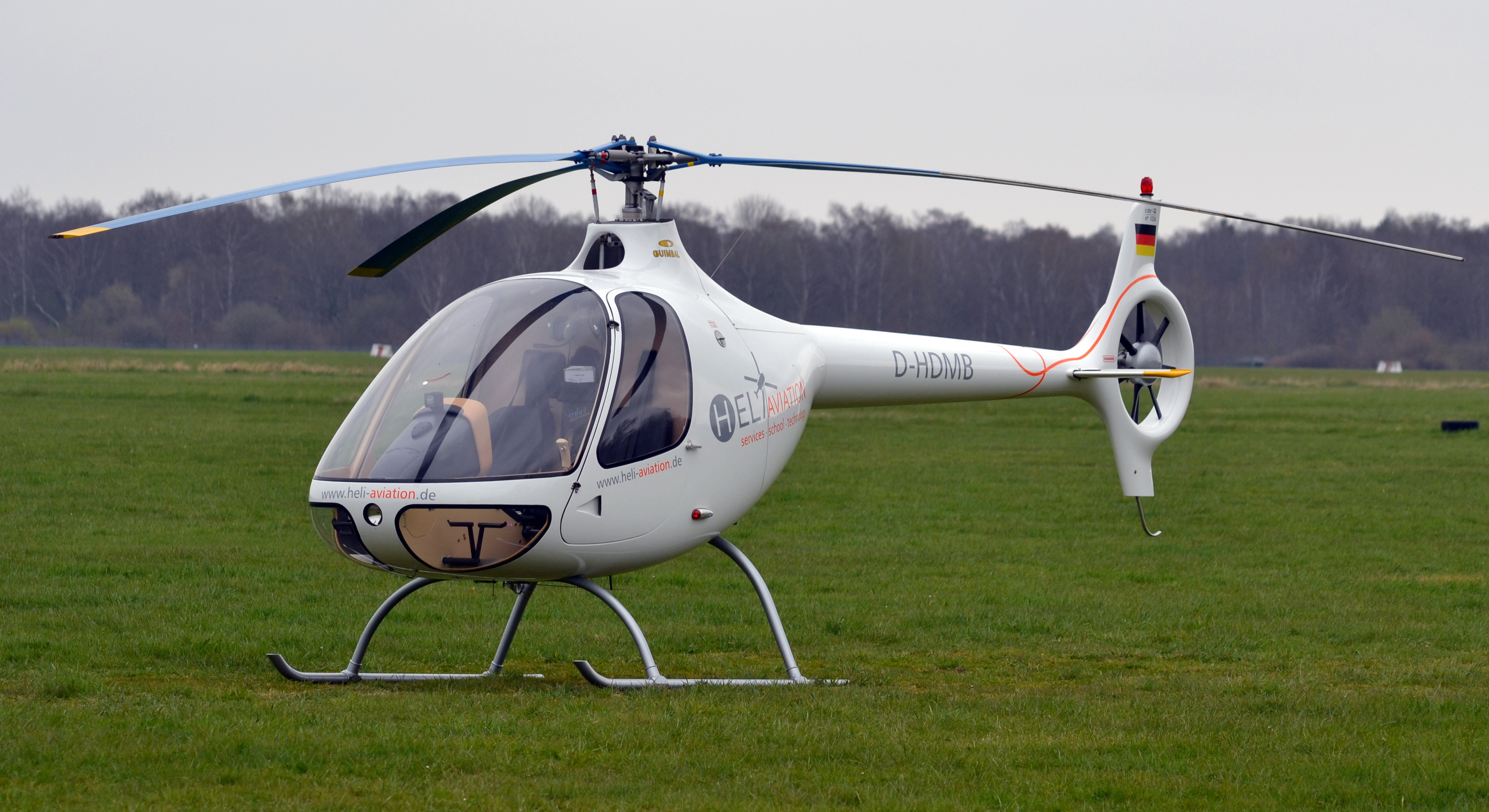
Guimbal Cabri G2, 2012

On 19 September 2008, the first production aircraft was officially delivered to iXAir, a French training operator, during a ceremony at Aix-en-Provence Aerodrome; this aircraft being the first of an order of 10. Precision Helicopters of Newberg, Oregon, which is also an overseas distributor for the Cabri, served as the launch customer for the North American market, having received its first Cabri in February 2014.

Following its national debut in 2011, the United Kingdom soon emerged as one of the major operating nations of the type, having 14 Cabris in service with various operators by February 2016; this was projected to reach 28 by the end of 2016. In early 2015, Guimbal stated that the Cabri was in service with 32 operators worldwide, and that the firm presently had orders for another 100 aircraft. On 19 May 2017, the 200th Cabri was delivered to HeliGroup, the type's distributor in the United Kingdom; this delivery brought the U.K. fleet to 28, which was the largest national fleet of Cabri G2s in the world.

In 2015, it was also reported that 70% of all Cabri rotorcraft sold to date had been for training purposes; Bruno Guimbal has stated, "I designed the Cabri to be the best trainer that you can imagine".

== Accidents ==
A mid-air collision between a Cessna 152 and a Cabri G2 occurred on 17 November 2017 in the UK, causing four fatalities, two in each aircraft. Both aircraft were on training flights.

On November 8, 2020, two Cabri G2 (Registration 9M-HCA & 9M-HCB) collided in mid-air with one of the helicopters crashing while the other crash landed safely in nearby Taman Melawati, a suburb of Kuala Lumpur, Malaysia. Two people were killed. Both were from the same Heli Club based out of Subang Airport (SZB), Malaysia on training flights.

== Specifications ==
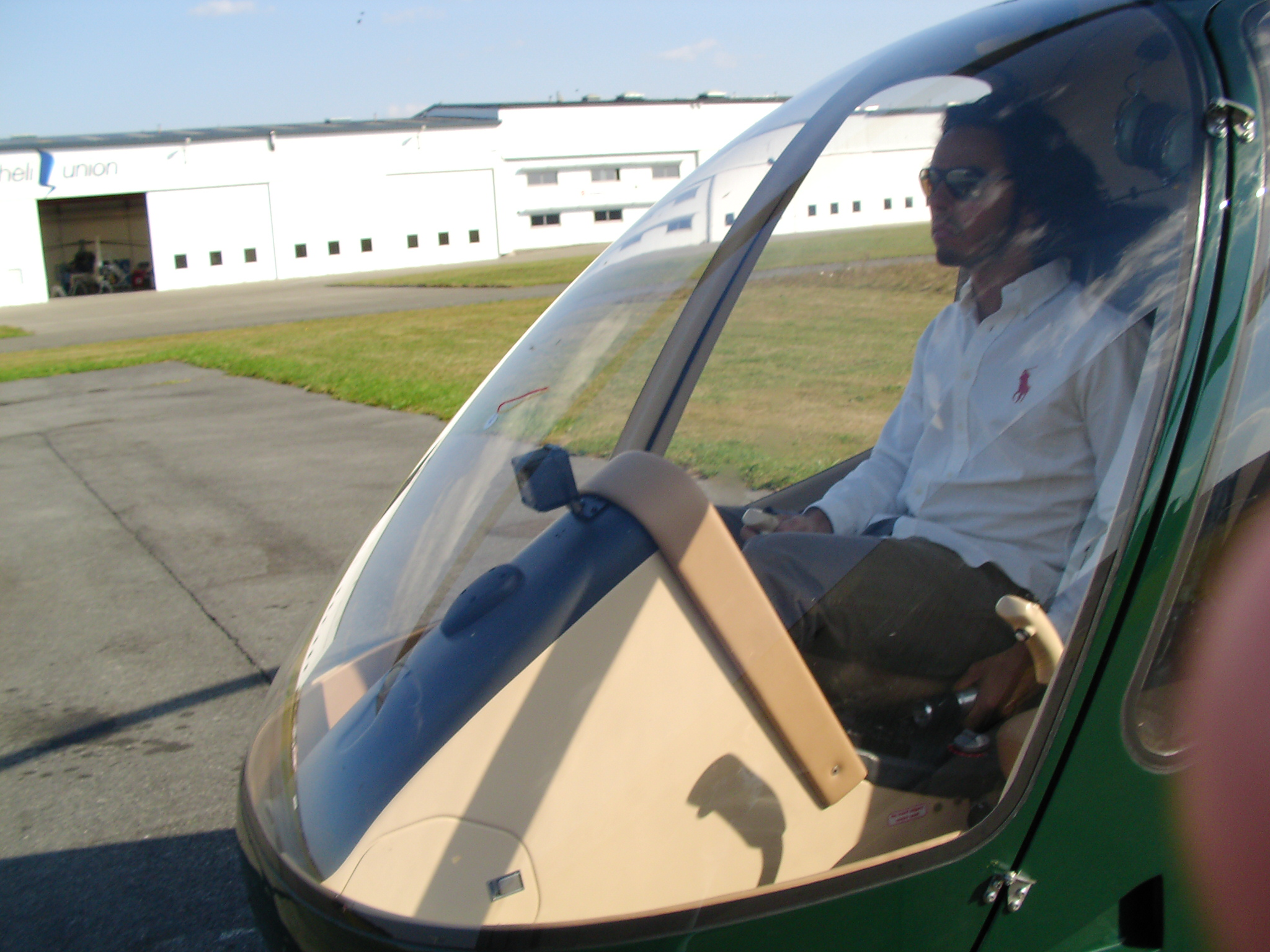
Forward cabin view of a Cabri G2

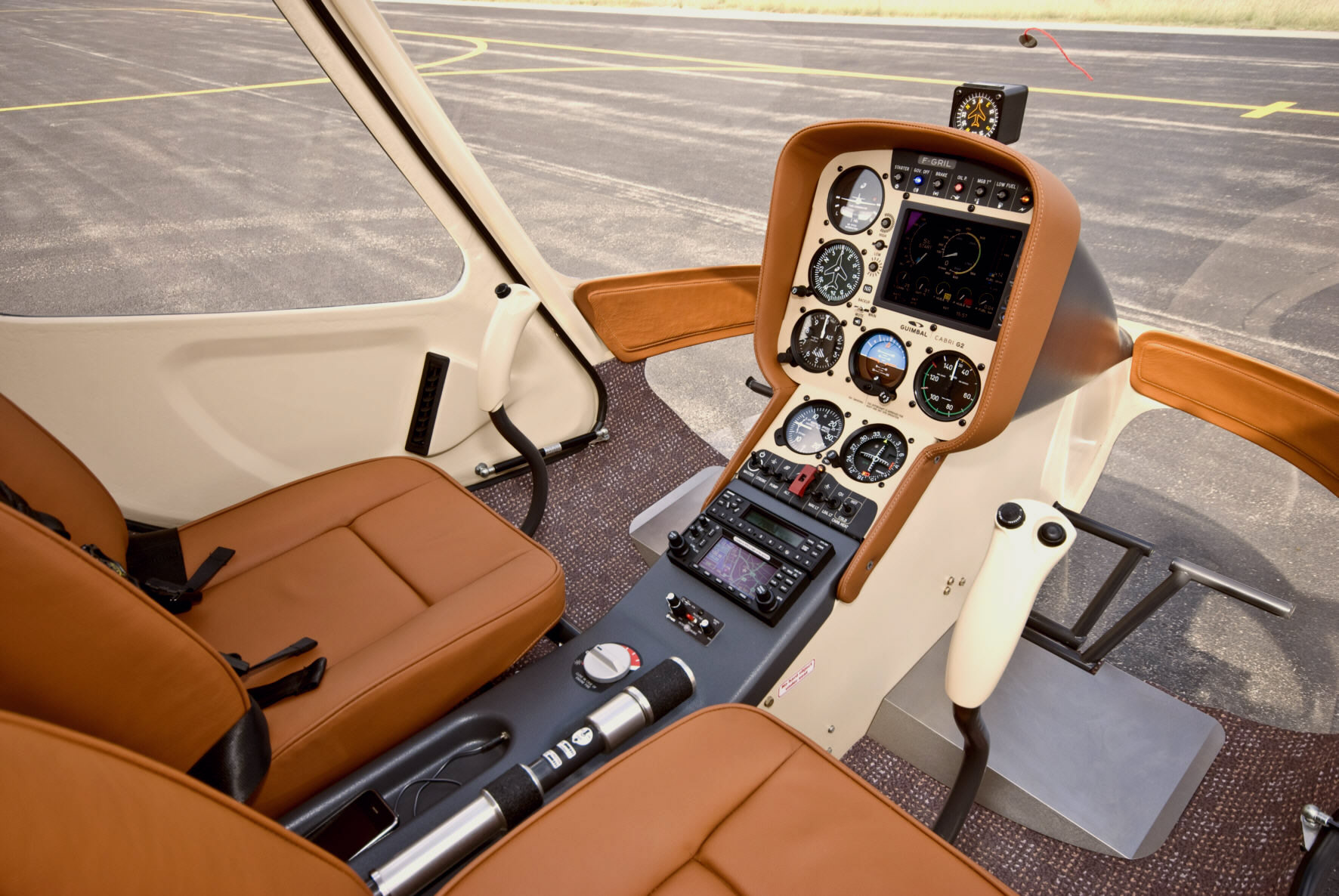
Cockpit of a Cabri G2

Data from EASA Type Certificate Data Sheet, Guimbal, Blade

General characteristics

- Crew: 2 (Removable controls for left seat)
- Length: 6.31 m (20 ft 8 in)
- Width: 1.24 m (4 ft 1 in)
- Height: 2.37 m (7 ft 9 in)
- Gross weight: 700 kg (1,543 lb)
- Powerplant: 1 × Lycoming O-360-J2A piston engine , 108 kW (145 hp)
- Main rotor diameter: 7.2 m (23 ft 7 in)

Performance

- Maximum speed: 185 km/h (115 mph, 100 kn)
- Cruise speed: 166 km/h (104 mph, 90 kn)
- Range: 700 km (430 mi, 380 nmi)
- Endurance: 4.5 hours
- Service ceiling: 3,963 m (13,000 ft)

== See also ==
External videos
- A Cabri G2 performing a demonstration flight
- Video of the Cabri manufacturing process
- In-flight cabin footage of Starlite Cabri G2

Related development

- Airbus Helicopters VSR700

Aircraft of comparable role, configuration, and era

- Curti Zefhir
- EDM Aerotec CoAX 2D
- Enstrom F-28
- Robinson R22
- Schweizer 300

Related lists

- List of rotorcraft
