= Airbus Helicopters VSR700 =

Unmanned reconnaissance helicopter developed by Airbus

VSR700
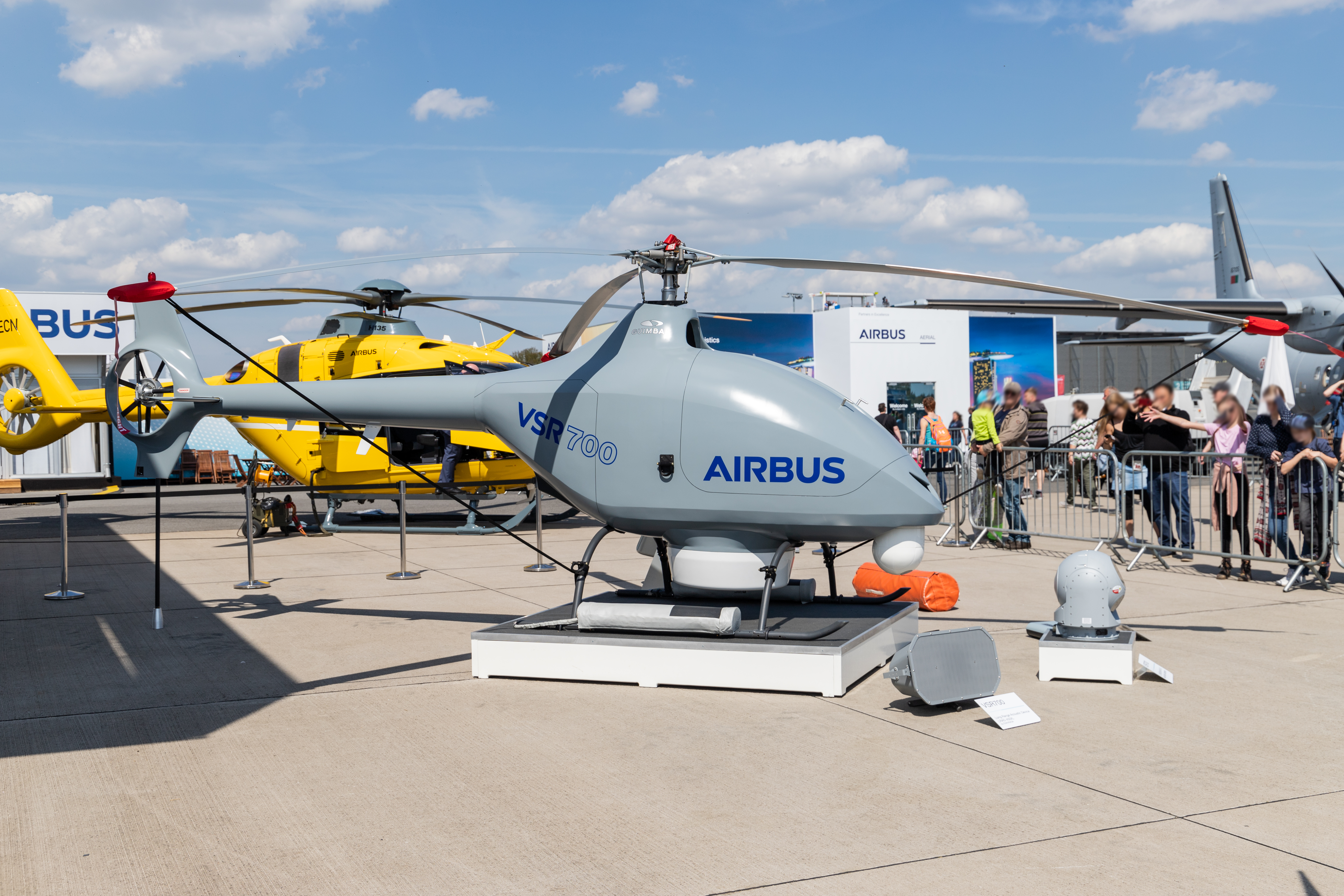
- VSR700 at ILA Berlin Air Show 2018

General information
- Type: unmanned reconnaissance helicopter
- National origin: France
- Manufacturer: Airbus Helicopters

History
- First flight: 8 November 2019
- Developed from: Guimbal Cabri G2

The Airbus Helicopters VSR700 is an unmanned reconnaissance helicopter being developed by Airbus Helicopters (formerly Eurocopter).

== Design and development ==
Developed by Airbus, the VSR700 is based on the Cabri G2 light helicopter, developed and produced by Hélicoptères Guimbal. Airbus was awarded a contract by the French Navy toward the end of 2017. With a maximum take-off weight around 700 kg (1,500 lb), it is a larger aircraft than the Austrian Camcopter S-100 which the French Navy has been operating since 2012.

The drone is designed to eventually deploy from Mistral-class amphibious assault ship, as well as from frigates.

The prototype VSR700 performed its first flight at a drone test centre near Aix-en-Provence, France, on 8 November 2019. In 2025 it was indicated that the French Navy planned to order the system for integration on the French Navy's major surface combatants starting in 2027-28. Initially six systems are to be delivered to the navy.

The proposed anti-submarine warfare version of the drone is equipped with a surface-search radar, 4 Thales Sonoflash sonobuoys and Manned-Unmanned Teaming capability with the NH90 NFH.

== Specifications ==
Data from Airbus

General characteristics

- Capacity: 100 kg (220 lb) mission payload
- Length: 6.2 m (20 ft 4 in)
- Width: 1.24 m (4 ft 1 in)
- Height: 2.28 m (7 ft 6 in)
- Max takeoff weight: 700 kg (1,543 lb)
- Fuel capacity: 185 L (41 imp gal; 49 US gal)
- Powerplant: 1 × Thielert Centurion 2.0 diesel engine, 116 kW (155 hp)
- Main rotor diameter: 7.2 m (23 ft 7 in)

Performance

- Cruise speed: 220 km/h (140 mph, 120 kn)
- Endurance: 10 hours or >8 hours 100nm (185 km, 115 miles) from the boat.
- Service ceiling: 6,000 m (20,000 ft)

== See also ==
Related development

- Guimbal Cabri G2

Aircraft of comparable role, configuration, and era

- Northrop Grumman MQ-8B Fire Scout
- Leonardo Proteus

Related lists

- List of rotorcraft
