= Fenestron =

Helicopter anti-torque system based on a ducted fan

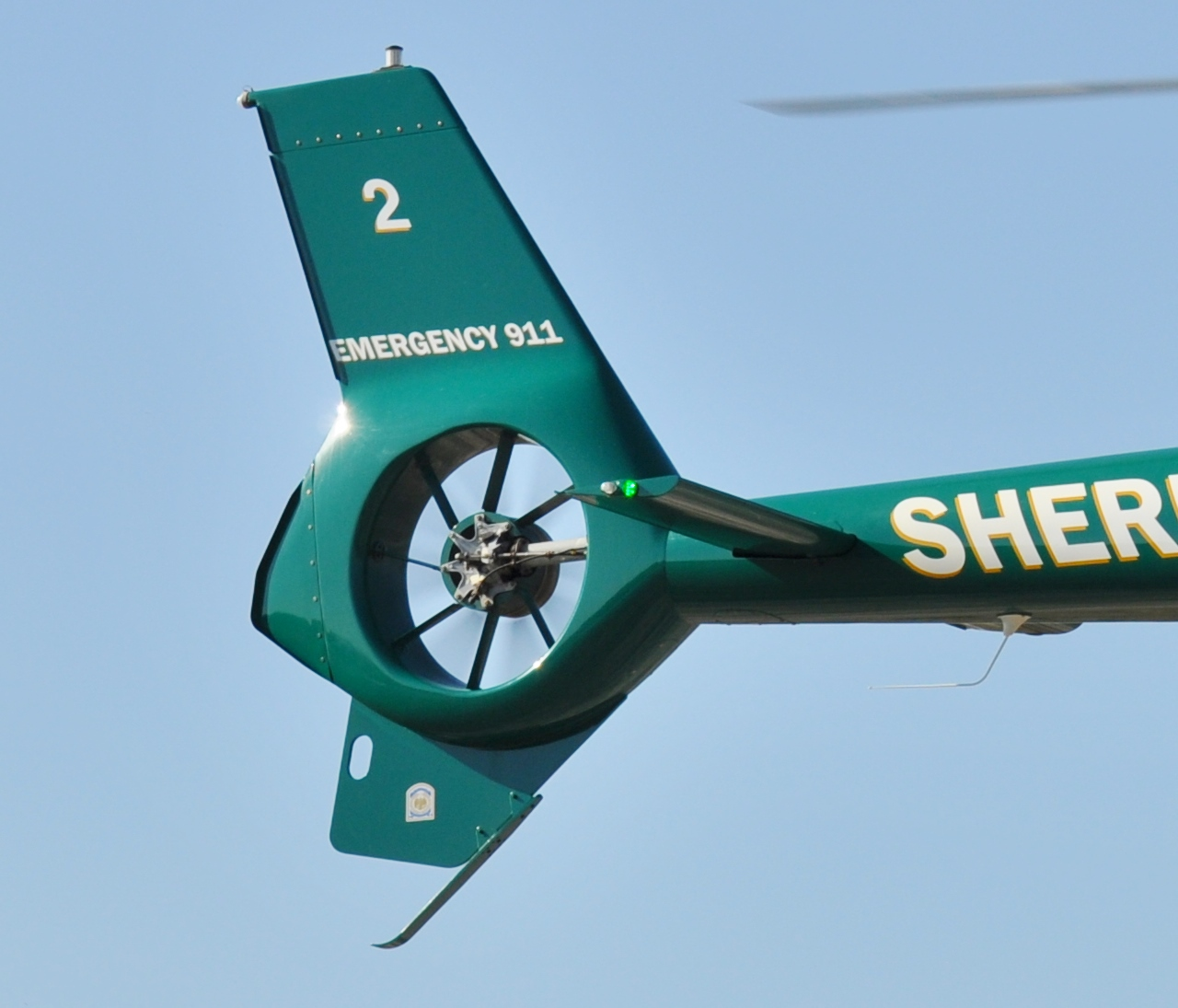
A view of a Fenestron tail rotor on a Eurocopter EC120B

A Fenestron (sometimes alternatively referred to as a fantail or a "fan-in-fin" arrangement) is an enclosed helicopter tail rotor that operates like a ducted fan. The term Fenestron is a trademark of multinational helicopter manufacturing consortium Airbus Helicopters (formerly known as Eurocopter). The word itself comes from the Occitan term for a small window, (Note: Born in Aix-en-Provence and fiercely loyal to his roots, Paul Fabre chose the name fenestrou, a Provencal word meaning small round window, to designate his shrouded rotor invention.) and is ultimately derived from the Latin word fenestra for window.

Like the conventional tail rotor it replaces, a Fenestron counteracts the torque generated by the main rotor. However, it differs from a conventional open tail rotor by being integrally housed within the tail boom. While conventional tail rotors typically have between two and six blades, Fenestrons have between seven and eighteen blades; these may have variable angular spacing so that the noise is distributed over different frequencies. By placing the fan within a duct, several distinct advantages over a conventional tail rotor are obtained, such as a reduction in tip vortex losses and the potential for substantial noise reduction, while also shielding both the tail rotor itself from collision damage and ground personnel from the hazard posed by a traditional spinning rotor.

It was first developed for use on an operational rotorcraft by the French company Sud Aviation (now part of Airbus Helicopters), being first adopted upon the Aérospatiale Gazelle. Since then, the company (and its successors) have installed Fenestrons upon many of their helicopters. Other manufacturers have also made limited use of the Fenestron on some of their own products, including the American aerospace corporations Bell Textron and Boeing, the Russian rotorcraft manufacturer Kamov, the Chinese Harbin Aircraft Industry Group, and the Japanese conglomerate Kawasaki Heavy Industries.

== History ==
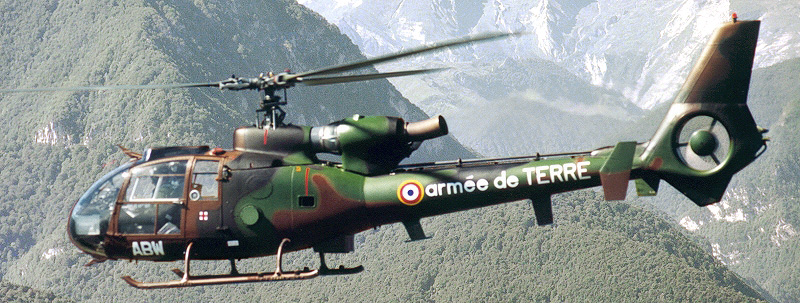
An SA 342M Gazelle of the French Army's Light Aviation (ALAT), the first Fenestron-equipped helicopter to enter production

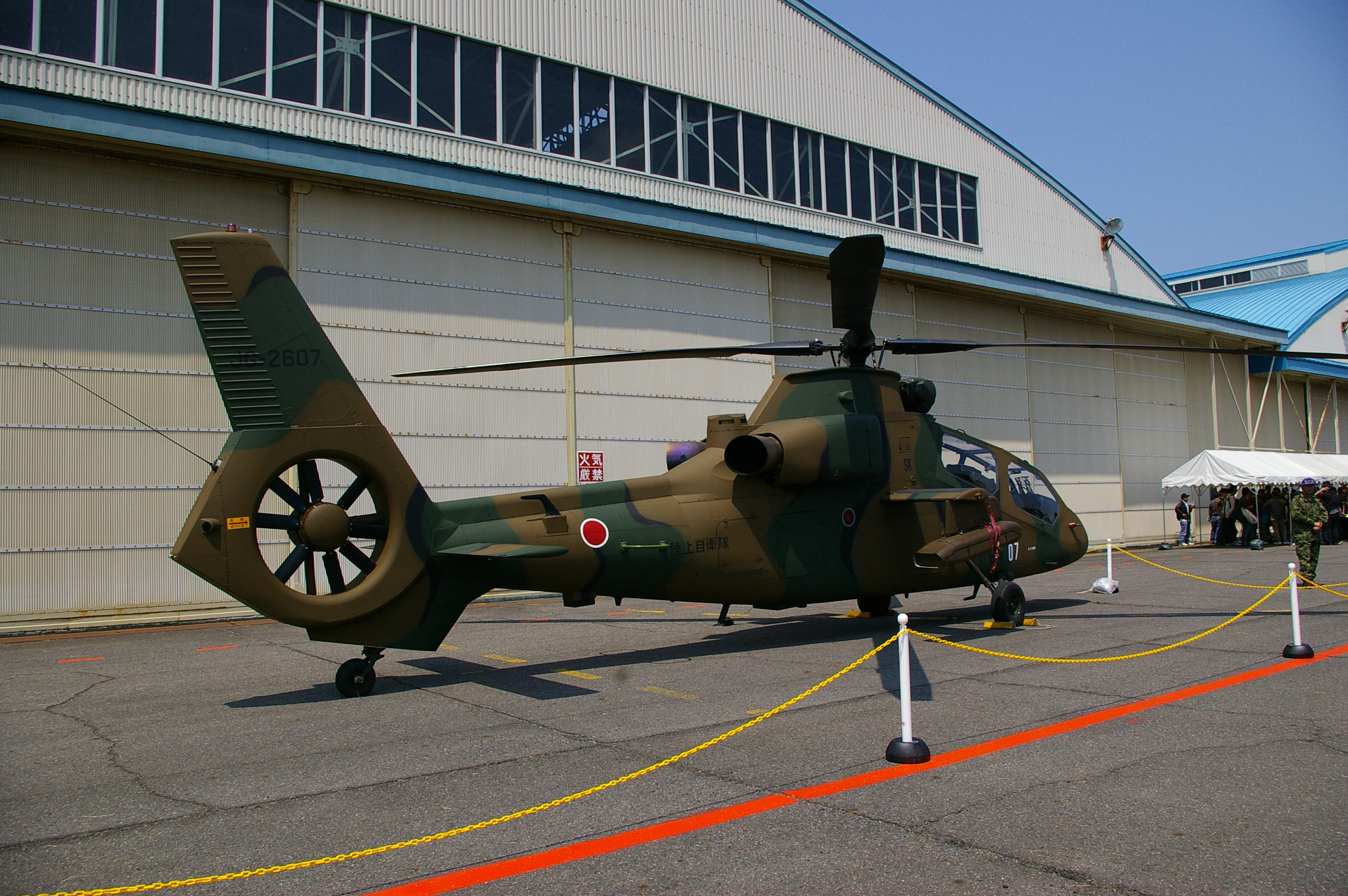
Fenestron on a Kawasaki OH-1 reconnaissance helicopter

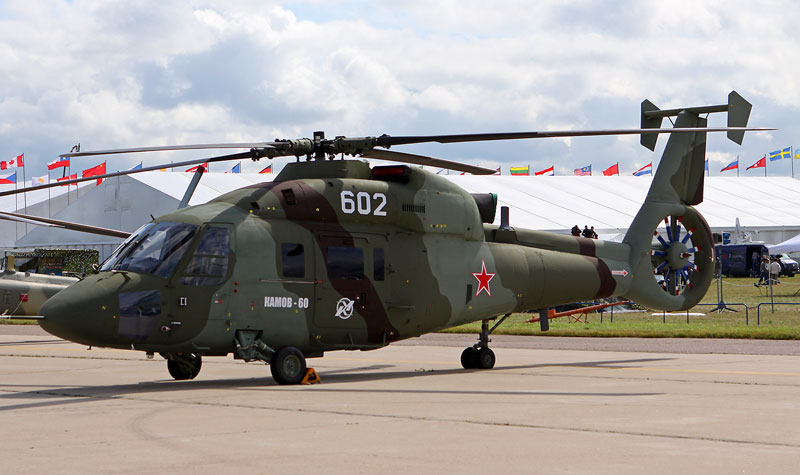
Fenestron on a Kamov Ka-60 at the MAKS Air Show, 2009

The concept of the Fenestron was first patented in Great Britain by the Glaswegian engineering company G. & J. Weir Ltd. It was designed by British aeronautical engineer C. G. Pullin as an improvement to helicopters in British patent number 572417, and is registered as having been filed during May 1943. At that time, Weir had been participated in development work for the Cierva Autogiro Company, who was the holding company for the patent. In concept, the invention was to function as a viable replacement for the conventional tail rotor arrangement, aiming to produce improvements in both safety and performance upon such equipped rotorcraft. However, this early work in Britain would not directly lead to any released product by Cierva making use of this innovation. Instead, the Fenestron would only be further developed during the 1960s by an unrelated company.

The Fenestron was first practically applied by the French aircraft manufacturer Sud Aviation, who had decided to introduce it upon the second experimental model of their in-development SA 340 Gazelle (the first prototype had been furnished with a conventional tail rotor). The SA 340's Fenestron was designed by French aerodynamicist Paul Fabre; unusually, this unit had its advancing blade set at the top in defiance of conventional practice, but this was reasoned to pose little impact upon this particular helicopter. Fitted accordingly, on 12 April 1968, the SA 340 became the first rotorcraft to fly using a Fenestron tail rotor. Having been determined to have been satisfactory, this tail unit was retained and was put into production on a refined model of the rotorcraft, which was designated SA 341.

Over time, the design and performance of the Fenestron has been improved by Sud Aviation and its successor companies, as well as by other companies. During the late 1970s, Aérospatiale (which Sud Aviation had merged into) launched a second generation all-composite unit; it primarily featured a reversal of the blade's direction of rotation as well as adopting a 20% larger diameter duct for greater efficiency. This unit was fitted onto the Aérospatiale SA 360 Dauphin, along with its more successful AS365 Dauphin model and its derivatives. While further flight experiments were conducted using an even larger Fenestron upon an SA 330 Puma medium lift helicopter around the same time frame, it was concluded that there were practical limits to how large a helicopter such a configuration would be suited to, and production examples of the Puma retained a conventional tail rotor instead.

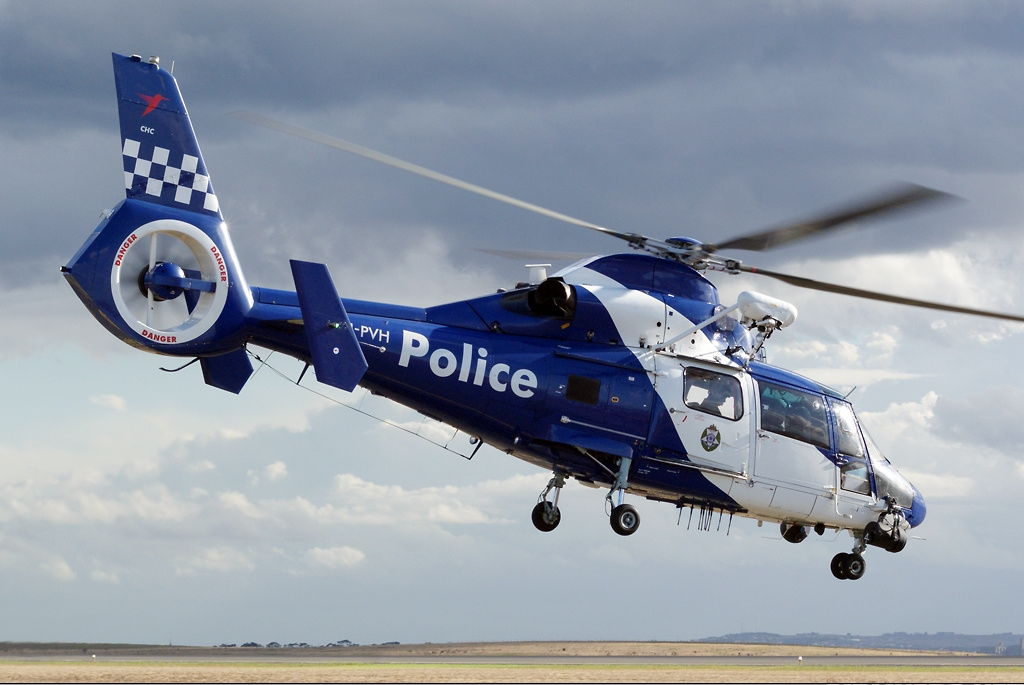
Fenestron on a Eurocopter AS365N3 Dauphin of the Victoria Police

During the 1990s, a third generation Fenestron was produced by Eurocopter (Aérospatiale's multinational successor), equipped with unevenly-spaced blades in order to optimize its noise levels; this unit was first fitted onto the company's EC135 helicopter, and was later incorporated into the designs of the EC130 and the EC145, the latter of which had been produced for over a decade with a conventional tail rotor. During the 2010s, multinational helicopter manufacturer Airbus Helicopters (a rebranded version of the Eurocopter entity) developed the Fenestron further for their new H160 helicopter, a medium-twin sized rotorcraft; in this revision, the fan duct was intentionally sloped by 12 degrees to achieve improved performance and greater stability when being operated with higher payloads and flown at lower speeds.

A Fenestron is normally paired with a larger vertical stabiliser unit that also performs the role of compensating for torque; this configuration has the effect of reducing wear on the rotor blades and transmission system, which in turn leads to maintenance savings. Furthermore, the adoption of larger diameter units, while posing some engineering challenges, normally increases their efficiency and decreases their power requirements. Advanced implementations of the Fenestron are provisioned with stator vanes and adjustable weights in order to optimise the blades for a reduction in power required and pitch control loads imposed. During the 2010s, Airbus Helicopters stated that it expected the design of the Fenestron to continue to be refined, in order to suit rotorcraft of increasing tonnages and to enable additional innovations to be made in the field.

Through multiple mergers from Sud Aviation to Airbus Helicopters, a considerable number of light, intermediate, and medium weight helicopters have used the Fenestron as an anti-torque tail rotor. Such implementations can be found on many of Eurocopter's helicopter range, such as the EC120 Colibri, EC130, EC135 (and its military version, te EC635), EC145, AS365 N/N3 Dauphin (also built as the MH/HH-65 Dolphin, a dedicated variant used by the United States Coast Guard, AS565 Panther, a dedicated variant for military use, and the license-built Harbin Z-9), and the enlarged EC155 (a wider, heavier and more advanced version of the AS365N/N3 series).

Other than Airbus Helicopters and its predecessors, other companies have also made use of Fenestrons. One such rotorcraft was the American-designed Boeing/Sikorsky RAH-66 Comanche, a stealthy aerial reconnaissance helicopter which was cancelled in 2004. Another example is the Sikorsky S-67 Blackhawk, which, in 1974, had a Fenestron for testing purposes used for 29 flight hours. It was removed in August the same year. Ducted fan tail rotors have also been used in the Russian Kamov Ka-60 medium-lift helicopter, and also on the Japanese military's Kawasaki OH-1 Ninja reconnaissance rotorcraft. French light helicopter manufacturer Hélicoptères Guimbal has also used a Fenestron for their Guimbal Cabri G2, a compact reciprocating engine-powered rotorcraft. Chinese Harbin Aircraft Industry Group uses a Fenestron in their Z-19 reconnaissance/attack helicopter. American Bell Textron also used a Fenestron in their Bell 360 Invictus, a proposed helicopter design intended for the Future Attack Reconnaissance Aircraft project.

== Advantages ==
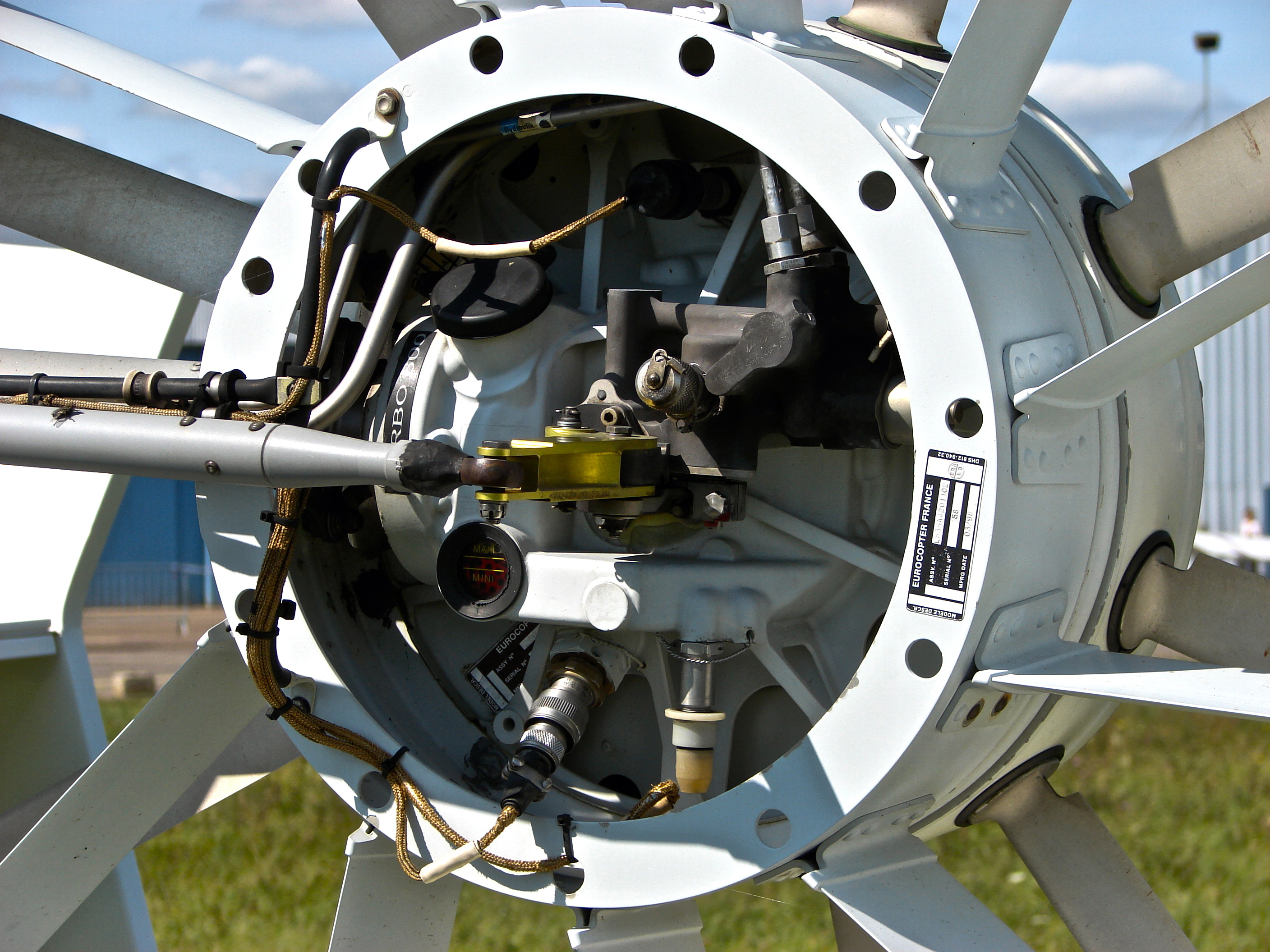
Detail of the pitch control mechanism of an EC135 Fenestron

- Increased safety for people on the ground because the enclosure provides peripheral protection.
- Greatly reduced noise and vibration due to the enclosure of the blade tips and greater number of blades, especially if the blades are not evenly spaced.
- A decrease in power requirements during the cruise phase of flight.
- Typically lighter and smaller than conventional counterparts. (Note: A computational simulation has suggested that the maximum achievable thrust of a Fenestron is twice as high and at identical power, thrust was slightly greater than for a conventional rotor of the same diameter.)
- A lower susceptibility to foreign object damage because the enclosure makes it less likely to suck in loose objects such as small rocks.
- Enhanced anti-torque control efficiency and reduction in pilot workload.
- Reduced chance for the tail rotor to cause accidents, because it cannot strike the environment.

== Disadvantages ==
The Fenestron's disadvantages compared to a conventional tail rotor are common to all ducted fans compared to propellers. They include:

- Greater weight, power requirement, and air resistance brought by the enclosure;
- Higher construction and purchasing cost.
- Increase in power required during the hover phase of flight.

== See also ==
- NOTAR
