= Aix-en-Provence Aerodrome =

Aix-en-Provence Aerodrome Aérodrome d'Aix-en-Provence
- IATA: none; ICAO: LFMA

Summary
- Airport type: Public
- Operator: CCI Marseille Provence
- Serves: Aix-en-Provence
- Location: Les Milles, France
- Elevation AMSL: 368 ft / 112 m
- Coordinates: 43°30′19″N 05°22′02″E

Map
- Location of airport in France

Runways
Direction	Length		Surface
Direction	m	ft	Surface
15/33	1,600	5,249	Asphalt
- Sources: French AIP, UAF DAFIF

Aix-en-Provence Aerodrome (French: Aérodrome d'Aix-en-Provence) (ICAO: LFMA), also known as Aix les Milles Airport (Aéroport Aix les Milles), is an airport serving Aix-en-Provence, a commune in the Bouches-du-Rhône department of the Provence-Alpes-Côte d'Azur region of France. It is located 6 km (3.2 NM) west-southwest of Aix-en-Provence, in the village of Les Milles.

It formerly served as a military air base, known as Base Aerienne 114 d'Aix Les Milles. A campus of the École nationale de l'aviation civile (French civil aviation university) is also located at the aerodrome.

== Facilities ==
The airport resides at an elevation of 368 feet (112 m) above mean sea level. It has one runway designated 15/33 with an asphalt surface measuring 1,600 by 30 metres (5,249 ft × 98 ft).

== See also ==
- List of airports in France
- List of French Air Force bases
