= Eurocopter EC120 Colibri =

Utility helicopter

EC120 Colibri H120 HC120
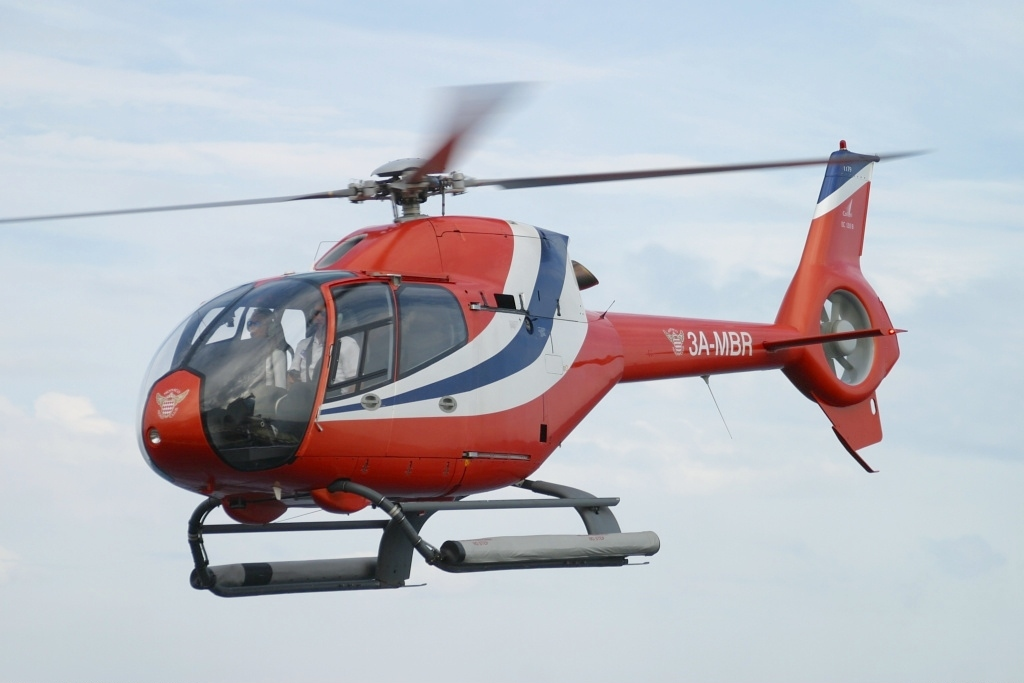
- EC120B

General information
- Type: Light utility helicopter
- National origin: Multinational
- Manufacturer: Eurocopter; Airbus Helicopters; Harbin Aircraft Industry Group
- Designer: Eurocopter; CATIC; Harbin Aircraft Manufacturing Corporation; ST Aerospace
- Status: Out of production
- Number built: ~700 (2015)

History
- Manufactured: 1995–2017
- Introduction date: 1998
- First flight: 9 June 1995

The Airbus Helicopters H120 (formerly Eurocopter EC120) Colibri ("hummingbird") is a five-seat, single-engine, light utility helicopter. Jointly designed and developed by Eurocopter, China National Aero-Technology Import & Export Corporation (CATIC), Harbin Aviation Industries (Group) Ltd (HAIG) and Singapore Technologies Aerospace Ltd (STAero) at Eurocopter France's Marignane facility, the EC120B was assembled by Eurocopter in France and Australia.

In China, the aircraft is produced by Harbin Aircraft Manufacturing Corporation (HAMC) as the HC120. In 2004, HAMC began local manufacturing of the HC120 at their assembly line in Harbin, in northern China. In the Chinese market, both the People's Liberation Army and multiple local police forces have purchased HC120 helicopters.

== Development ==
The EC120 Colibri has its origins in the P120, a proposal by French helicopter manufacturer Aérospatiale that was intended to replace both their Aérospatiale Gazelle and Aérospatiale SA 315B Lama single engine helicopters. During the 1980s, Aérospatiale sought international partners with which to co-produce the P120, these included aerospace companies in China, Singapore, and Australia. In the aftermath of the Chinese Government's crackdown on the Tiananmen Square protests of 1989, the exclusion of Chinese involvement in the project was speculated.

On 20 October 1992, a contract for the joint development contract of the new helicopter was signed by the three principle partners of the project, the newly formed Eurocopter, China National Aero-Technology Import & Export Corporation (CATIC) and Singapore Aerospace Ltd (STAero). Under the joint development agreement, Eurocopter received a 61% controlling interest and technical leader in the programme, CATIC received a 24% work share and STAero received a 15% work share; CATIC designed and produced the cabin structure and fuel system, STAero produced the tail boom, access doors, and composite materials, while Eurocopter produced the dynamic assemblies, installed the avionics, electrical and hydraulic systems, and conducted the final assembly activity. Development of the rotorcraft allowed Eurocopter to extend its range to include 1.5-tonne (1.7-short-ton) rotorcraft.

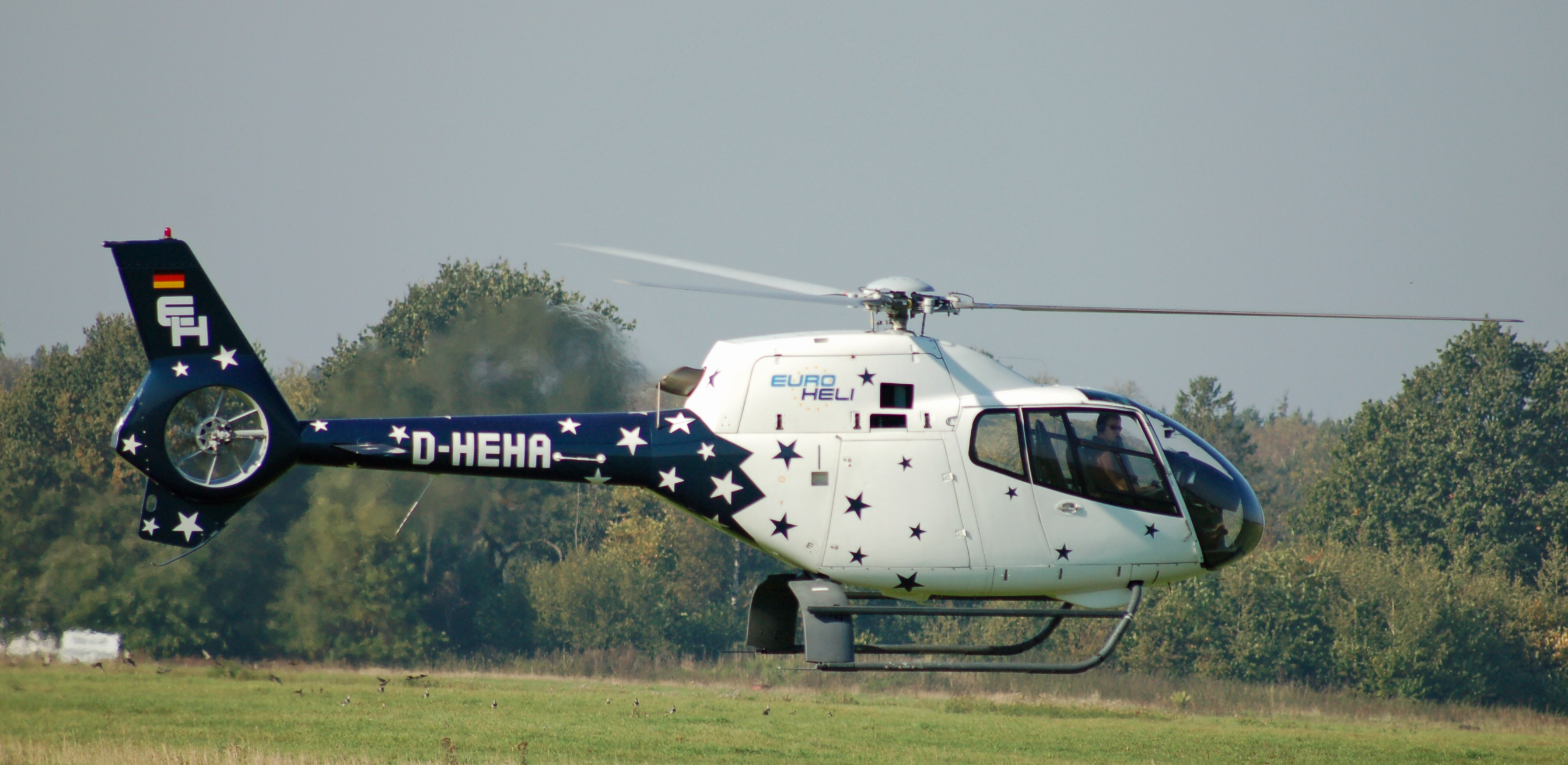
An EC120 hovering, 2010

On 9 June 1995, the first prototype EC120 Colibri conducted its maiden flight. By February 1996, the prototype had accumulated 60 flight hours, a second prototype joined the test program later that year. In February 1997, the EC120 Colibri was formally launched at the Helicopter Association International (HAI) show in Anaheim, California; by June 1997, more than 50 orders had been received for the type. By October 1998, more than 100 orders had been received for the type, leading Eurocopter to increase the production rate from four helicopters per month to six. In 2002, Eurocopter was in the process of establishing a second assembly line for the EC120 at Australian Aerospace's facility in Brisbane, Australia.

In September 2003, Eurocopter and China Aviation Industry Corporation II (AVIC II) expanded their partnership agreement to include a co-production arrangement with AVIC II-subsidiary Harbin Aircraft Industry Group (HAIG). On 11 June 2004, a final production agreement was signed; under the agreement, CATIA and HAIG received exclusive market rights in China, and Eurocopter agreed to stop selling French-built EC120s in mainland China. In June 2014, the People's Liberation Army of China became the launch customer for the Harbin-produced HC120, reportedly placing an order for eight of the type with options for fifty more.

On 30 November 2017 Airbus Helicopters formally announced the end of the H120 program citing low delivery numbers. Only five H120s were delivered in 2016 compared to 63 Robinson R-66s. Airbus stated they are moving away from the lower end of the market spectrum and those helicopters are not as sophisticated as their traditional product line.

=== Diesel demonstrator ===
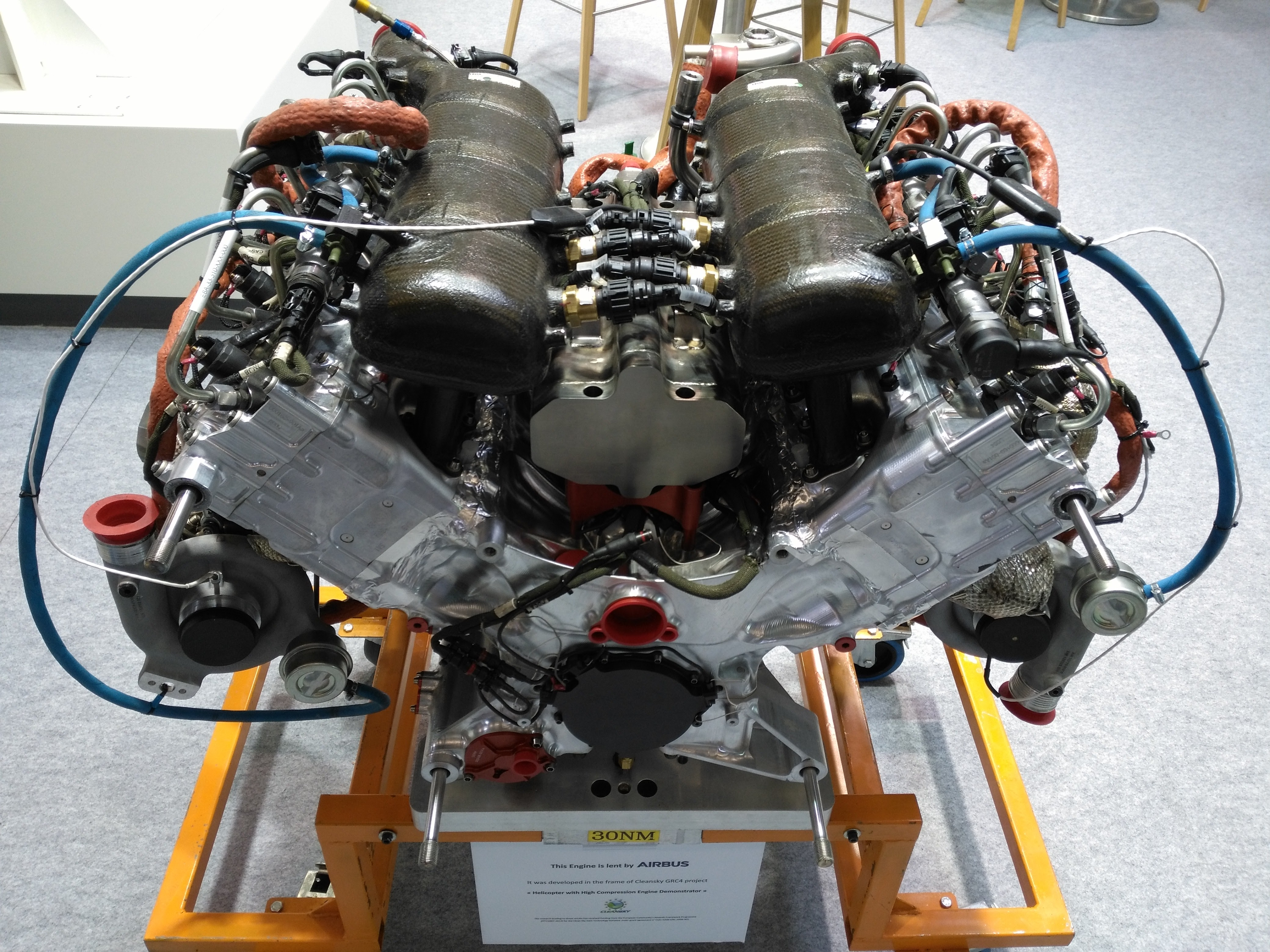
The AE440 presented by Mecachrome in 2017

Within the Green Rotorcraft European Clean Sky Joint Technology Initiative environmental research program started in 2011, a H120 Technology demonstrator equipped with a HIPE AE440 high-compression aircraft diesel engine, running on jet fuel, first flew on 6 November 2015. It aimed to reduce pollutant emissions and increase fuel efficiency, nearly double the range and enhance operations in hot and high conditions.

The powerplant trialed was a liquid-cooled, dry sump lubricated 4.6-liter 90° V8 engine with an 1,800-bar (26,000 psi) common rail direct injection, fully machined aluminum blocks, titanium connecting rods, steel pistons and liners, one turbocharger per cylinder bank. With an air-to-air intercooler, it weighed 197 kilograms (434 lb) without gearbox and the 330 kW (440 hp) installed powerpack weighs 249 kilograms (549 lb). The rotors were driven via the existing transmission, the faster-turning Turbomeca Arrius turboshaft was replaced with a multiplier gearbox.

The brake specific fuel consumption was 200 g/kW⋅h. Torque oscillations were reduced through a light torsional shaft and vibrations are damped by Silent blocs. It was manufactured by Teos Powertrain Engineering—a joint venture between Mecachrome and D2T (IFPEN group)—for the mechanical design, engine main parts manufacturing, assembly and testing and Austro Engine for the dual-channel FADEC and harness, fuel system, airworthiness. Power was maintained at 2,500 m and ISA+20° and it achieved 42% a fuel consumption reduction, reducing the direct operating costs by 30% along with simpler maintenance.

== Design ==
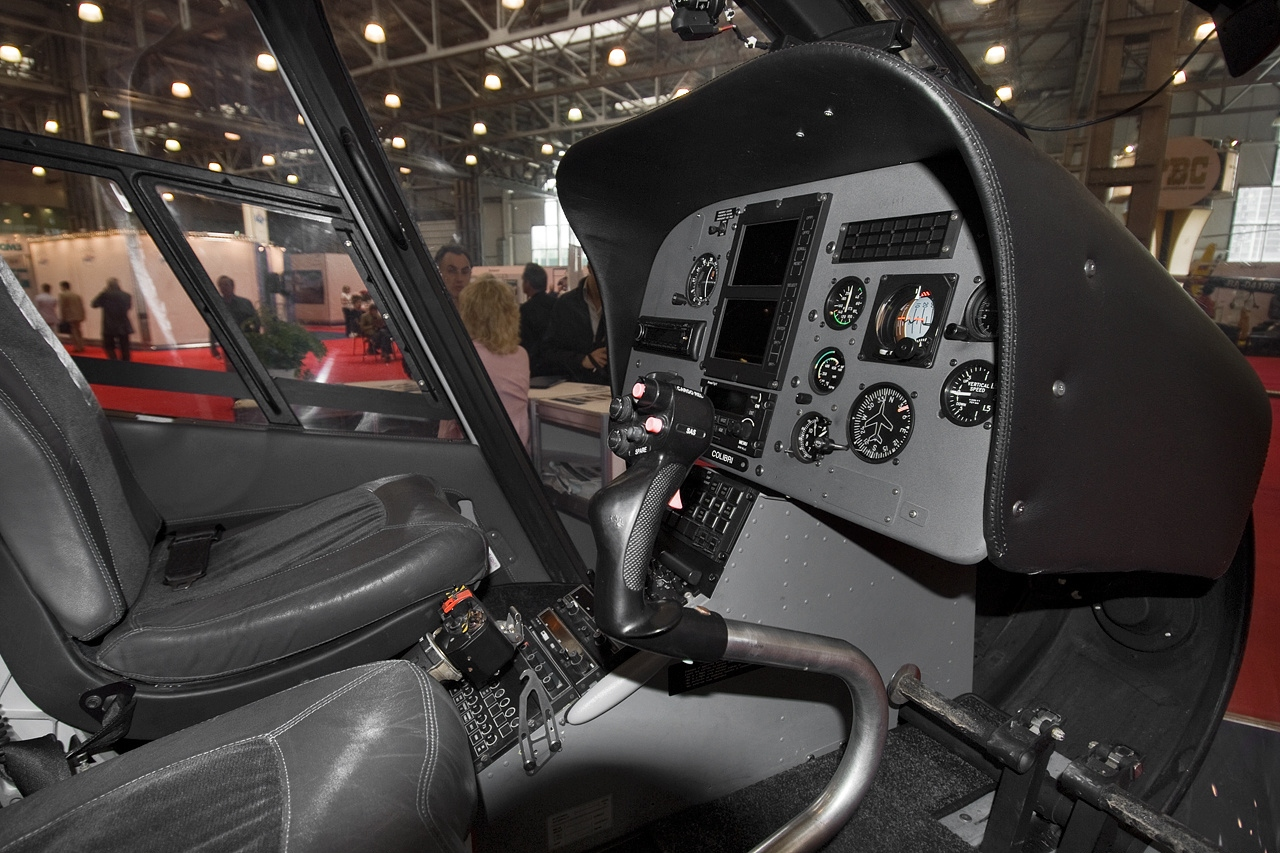
The cockpit of an EC120 B Colibri

The EC120B Colibri is a single-engine multimission helicopter, designed for safe, simple, and cost-effective operations. It incorporates several of Eurocopter's trademarked technologies, those of prominence are the three-bladed Spheriflex main rotor head and the eight-bladed fenestron anti-torque tail rotor; these have been partially credited with contributing to the rotorcraft's noise signature, which is 6.7 decibels below International Civil Aviation Organization (ICAO) limits.

Airbus Helicopters has claimed that the EC120 B possesses the lowest operating cost in its class. As of 2014, the EC120 has the distinction of being the only single-engine rotorcraft to be certified to JAR/FAR 27 standards; measures incorporated to meet these standards include an energy-attenuating main structure, energy-absorbent seats for all on board, and a crash-resistant fuel system.

The aircraft features a wide, ergonomic cabin with high levels of external visibility, which can accommodate a single pilot along with four passengers in typical passenger configuration. The design of the cabin is suitable for a wide variety of civilian and parapublic missions, such as utility transport, offshore transport, training, law enforcement, casualty evacuation and corporate transport. In the casualty evacuation role, the rotorcraft can carry one pilot and one stretcher patient as well as one or two medical attendants.

In a cargo-carrying capacity, the EC120 can carry one pilot plus 2.94 m^{3} (104 cu ft) of total useful load volume spread between the cabin and the 0.8 m^{3} (28 cu ft) hold, which is externally accessible from the right-hand side and to the rear, as well as from the cabin in some configurations. To ease cargo operations, the cabin floor is flat and unobstructed; alternatively, a cargo sling can be installed to carry cargo of up to 700 kg (1,540 lb).

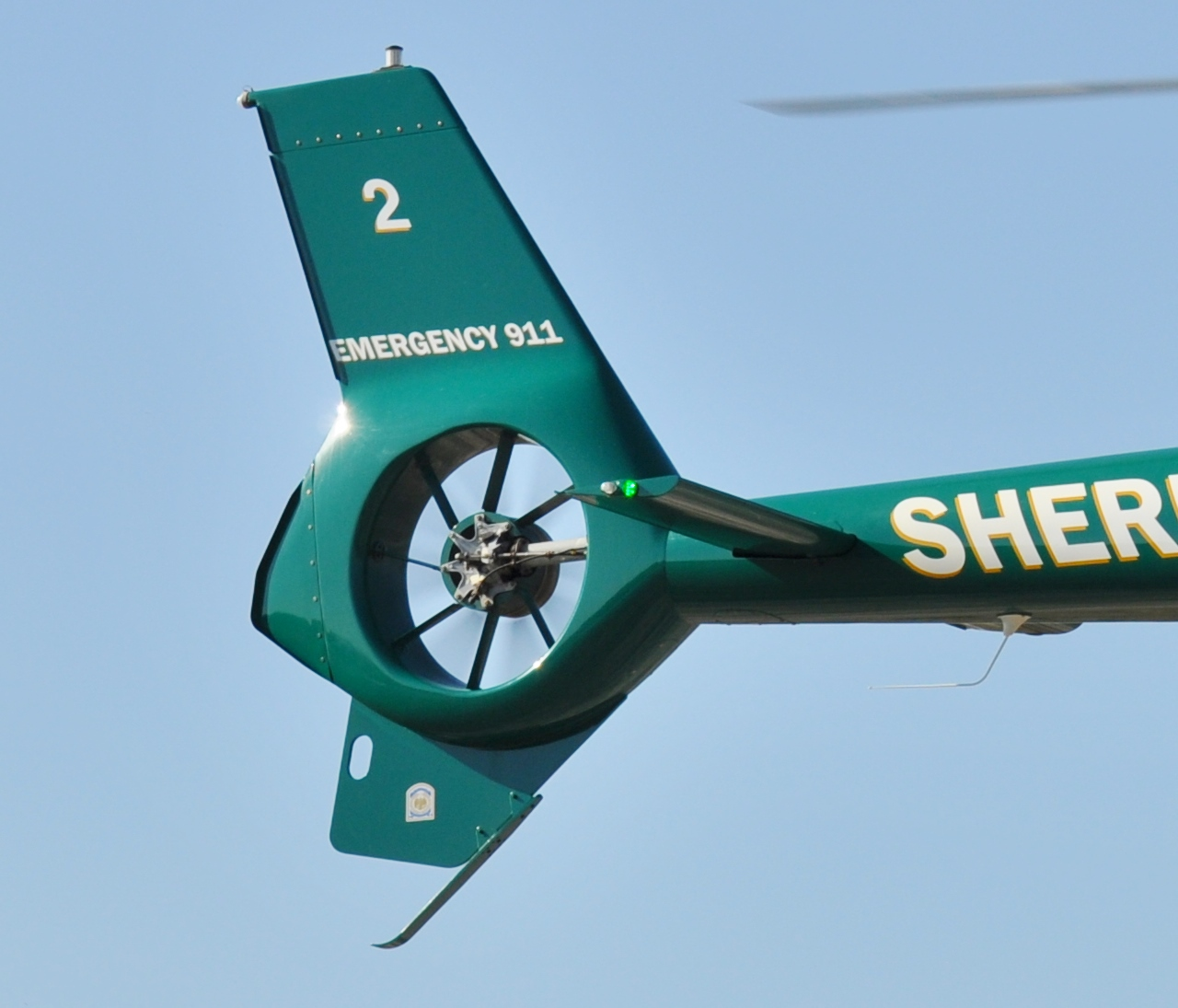
A view of the EC120B's tailboom and fenestron anti-torque tail fan

According to Airbus Helicopters, the EC120B integrates a high level of advanced technology to make the rotorcraft easier and safer to fly, as well as to reduce costs. A particular emphasis was placed on allowing end-customers to perform as much of the maintenance tasks themselves. The primary instrument panel is the twin-screen vehicle and engine multifunction display (VEMD) which provides control and monitoring of various aspects of the rotorcraft, such as the fenestron tail rotor and key engine parameters; the VEMD decreases overall pilot workload for greater safety. In a baseline configuration, flight controls are installed only on the right-hand side, dual controls or left-hand only flight controls can be optionally installed. Third parties have offered their own avionics suites for the EC120, adding functionality such as an autopilot.

In addition to various civil roles, the EC120 has also been used by several military operators to conduct training, observation and light utility missions. Airbus Helicopter has promoted the type in a training capacity due to features such as positive control response, performance computation systems, modern instrumentation for ease of use, overall compact size, and a high level of cabin visibility.

A wide range of optional equipment can be installed upon the EC120 B, this includes a wire strike protection system, air conditioning, sand filter, skis, windshield wipers, electrical external mirrors, a cargo sling, emergency flotation gear, forward looking infrared (FLIR) cameras, and external spotlights. For corporate customers, the EC120 can be equipped with a Stylence interior, offering a luxurious interior with leather upholstery, in-flight office and telecommunications facilities, along with reduced noise and vibration levels via additional insulation.

== Operational history ==
External videos
- In-cockpit view of EC120 B startup sequence
- Spanish EC120 display at NATO Days 2013 Ostrava

The first EC120B was delivered in 1998. By 2008, Eurocopter had already delivered more than 550 Colibris to various customers.

In 2004, the United States Department of Homeland Security U.S. Customs and Border Protection (CBP) selected the EC120B to meet its Light Sign Cutter requirement, a program potentially involving 55 aircraft with a total value of US$75 million in then-year dollars. In 2006, the CBP ordered 15 EC120B helicopters, with a further five aircraft since ordered.

The Spanish Air and Space Force (SASF) has procured a number of EC120s, which are used as rotary-wing trainers at the Armilla AFB. In 2003, the SPAF formed an aerobatic display team, the Patrulla ASPA, which use the type; a typical display involves five EC120s performing complex manoeuvers in addition to formation flight.

In January 2008, the French Defense Ministry selected the EC120 as the French Army's new lead-in rotary-wing trainer to replace the Aérospatiale Gazelle. 36 EC120 Bs equipped with Sagem avionics shall be operated through a 22-year public-private partnership (PPP) with operator Hélidax. On 12 October 2010, the final EC120 was delivered to Hélidax.

Since 2011, a number of EC120s have been operated by the traffic police of Kurdistan, Iraq. As of 2014, the crews are trained to undertake surveillance and rescue missions.

== Variants ==
P120L prototype before type redesignation to EC120 Colibri.

- EC120B Colibri: Standard designation.
- HC120: Chinese-built variant of the EC120.

== Operators ==
=== Civil operators ===
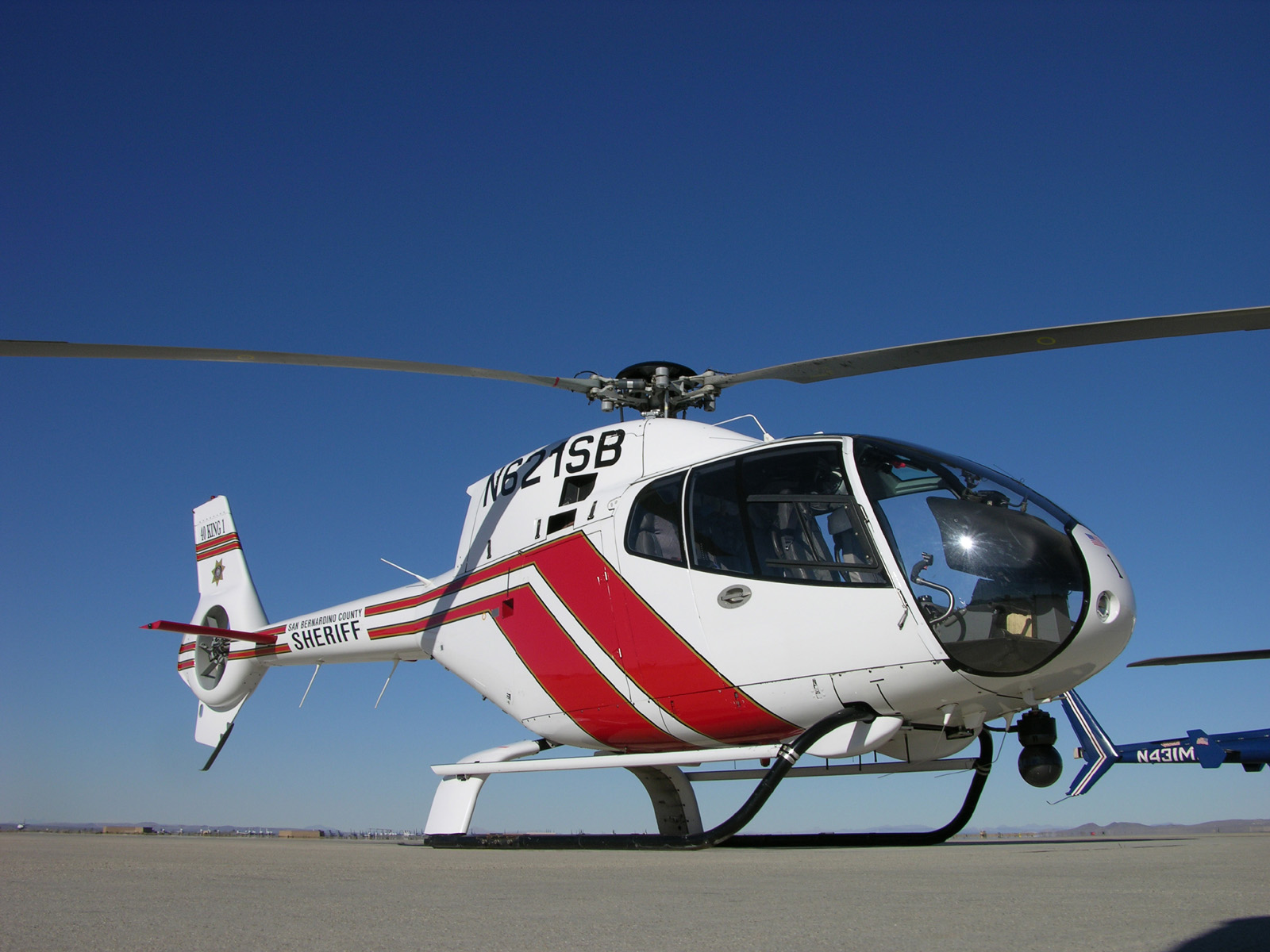
An EC120B of the San Bernardino County Sheriff's Department

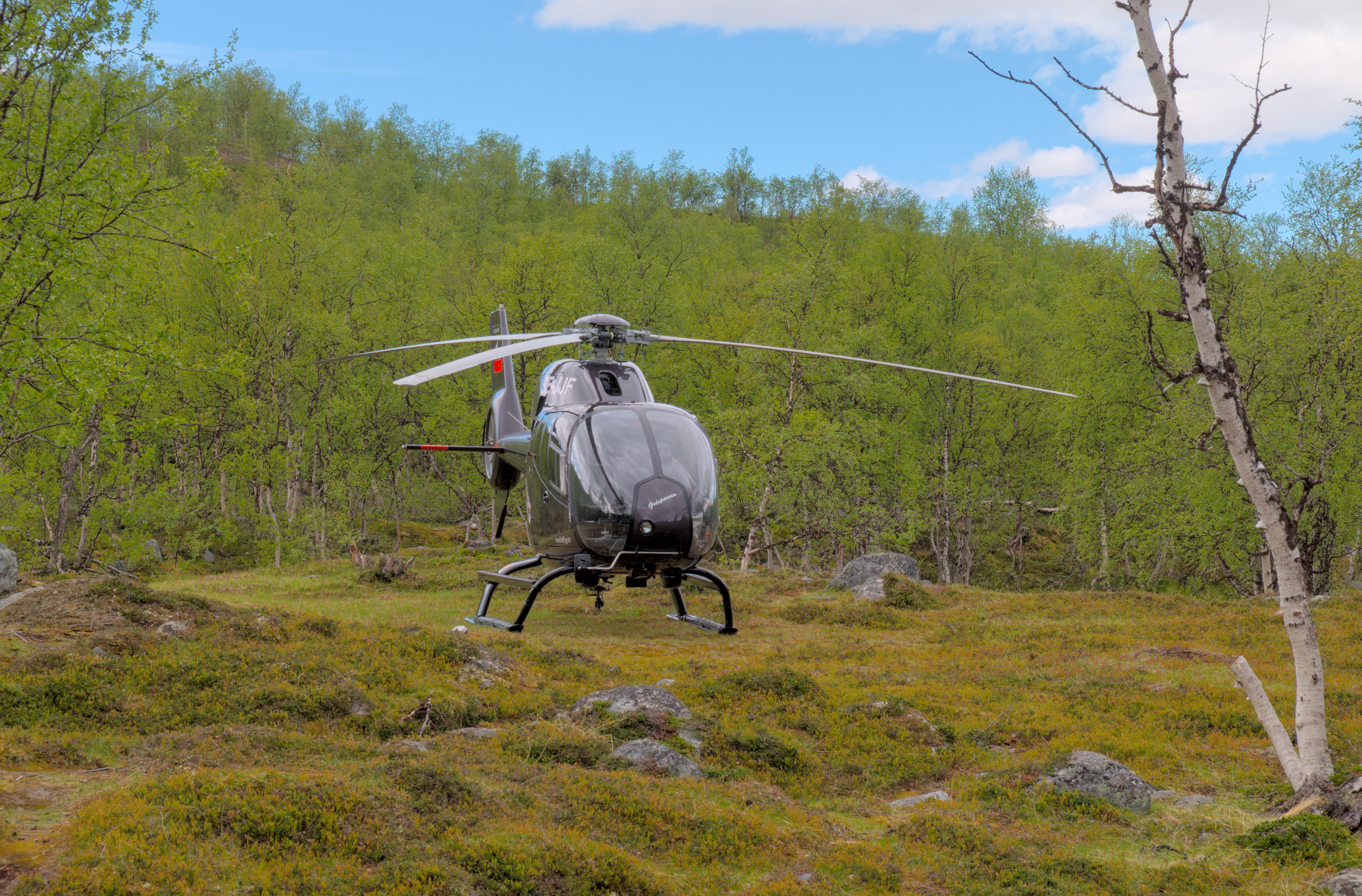
EC 120B operated by Fiskflyg in Sweden

The EC120 is used by both private individuals and companies, helicopter charter and training organisations as well as law enforcement and government use.

Australia

- Westpac Life Saver Rescue Helicopter Service

Brazil

- Federal Highway Police

Canada

- Calgary Police Service
- Royal Canadian Mounted Police
- Edmonton Police Service
- York Regional Police 2002-2023
- Winnipeg Police Service

China

- Shanghai Municipal Public Security Bureau

Germany

- Bundespolizei

Lithuania

- State Border Guard

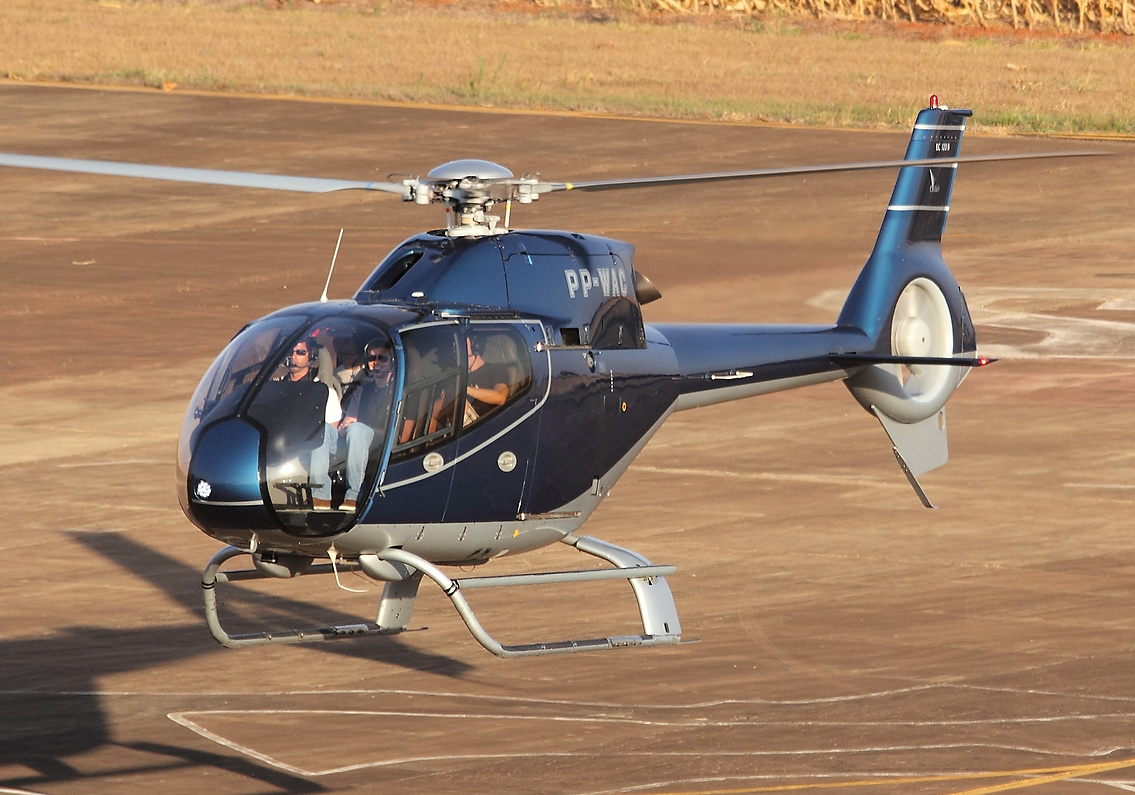
An EC120 hover taxis at Barretos Airport

Spain

- Spanish National Police

United States

- San Jose Police Department
- Santa Clara County Sheriff's Office
- Baltimore Police Department
- Austin Police Department
- Albuquerque Police Department
- Sacramento County Sheriff's Department

Kurdistan

• Kurdistan traffic police; also used for rescue and reconnaissance

=== Military operators ===
China

- PLAGF Aviation

France

- Hélidax (Army Aviation Training)

Indonesia

- Indonesian Army – remaining units were transferred to the Air Force in September 2024.
- Indonesian Navy – remaining units were transferred to the Air Force in November 2025.
- Indonesian Air Force

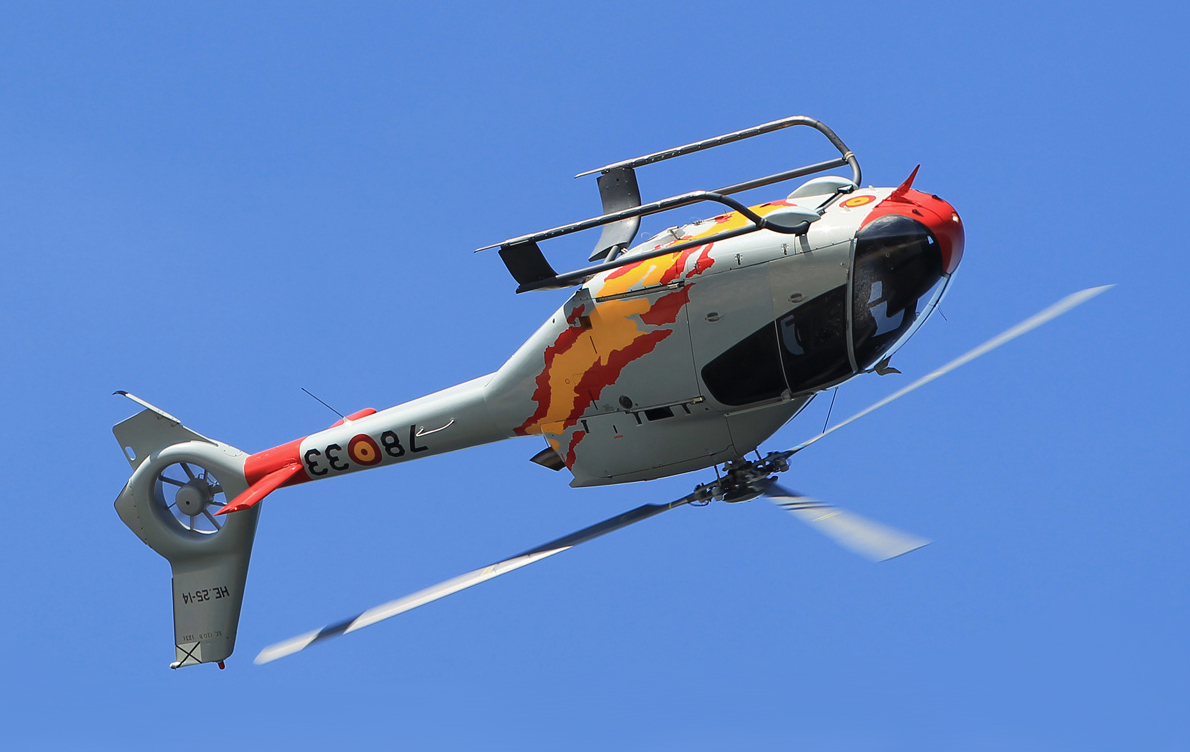
A Spanish Air Force Colibri demonstrates its agility with a barrel roll

Malaysia

- Royal Malaysian Air Force

Myanmar

- Myanmar Air Force

Singapore

- Republic of Singapore Air Force

Spain

- Spanish Air and Space Force

== Specifications (EC120 B) ==

Data from Jane's all the World's Aircraft 2007–08

General characteristics

- Crew: 1
- Capacity: 4 pax / 755 kg (1,664 lb) useful load (700 kg (1,543 lb) max slung load)
- Length: 11.52 m (37 ft 10 in) overall

9.6 m (31 ft) fuselage

- Height: 3.4 m (11 ft 2 in)
- Empty weight: 960 kg (2,116 lb)
- Max takeoff weight: 1,715 kg (3,781 lb) internal load

1,800 kg (3,968 lb) external load

- Fuel capacity: 416 L (110 US gal; 92 imp gal) in two tanks
- Powerplant: 1 × Turbomeca TM 319 Arrius 2F turboshaft, 376 kW (504 hp) for take-off

335 kW (449 hp) max continuous

- Main rotor diameter: 10.0 m (32 ft 10 in)
- Main rotor area: 78.54 m^{2} (845.4 sq ft)

Performance

- Cruise speed: 226 km/h (140 mph, 122 kn) max

191 km/h (119 mph; 103 kn) econ

- Never exceed speed: 278 km/h (173 mph, 150 kn)
- Range: 727 km (452 mi, 393 nmi) no reserves
- Endurance: 4 hours 32 minutes
- Service ceiling: 5,180 m (16,990 ft)
- Hover ceiling IGE: 2,820 m (9,252 ft)
- Hover ceiling OGE: 2,320 m (7,612 ft)
- Rate of climb: 6.1 m/s (1,200 ft/min)
- Disk loading: 21.8 kg/m^{2} (4.5 lb/sq ft) internal load

22.9 kg/m^{2} (5 lb/sq ft) external load

- Power/mass: 0.19 kW/kg (0.12 hp/lb) internal load

0.1835 kg (0 lb) external load

Avionics
Vehicle and Engine Multifunction Display (VEMD) with First Limit Indicator (FLI) fitted as standard.

== See also ==
Aircraft of comparable role, configuration, and era

- Bell 206
- Bell 407
- Bell 505 Jet Ranger X
- Eurocopter AS350 Écureuil
- MD Helicopters MD 500
- PZL SW-4 Puszczyk
- Robinson R66
