= Kolyma Aviation =

Regional airline in Magadan Oblast, Russia

OGUP Kolyma Aviation ОГУП Авиация Колымы

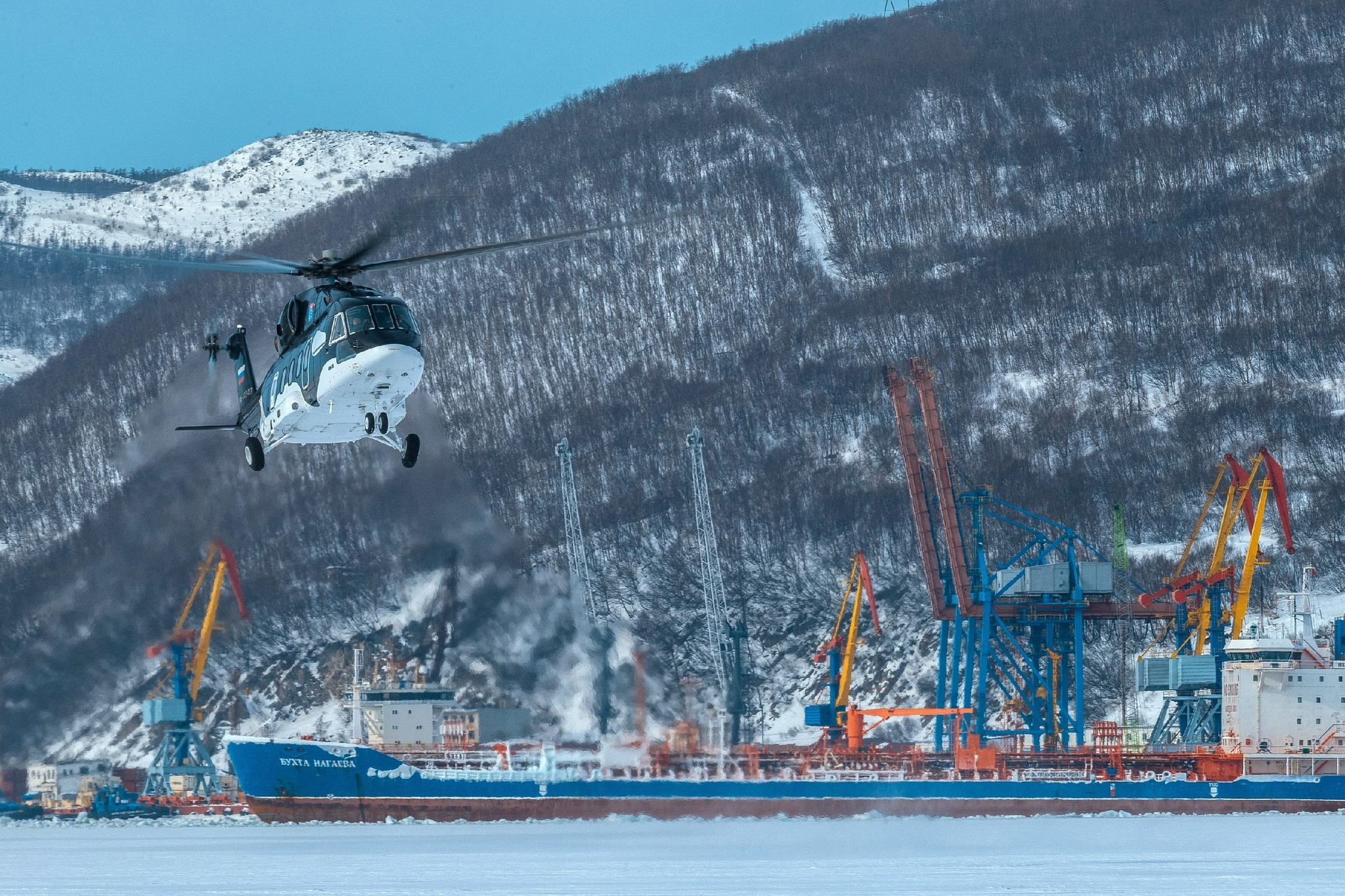
- Kolyma Aviation Mil Mi-38
- Founded: 4 October 2018; 7 years ago
- Commenced operations: 18 January 2019; 7 years ago
- Hubs: Magadan Sokol Airport
- Fleet size: 10
- Parent company: Government of Magadan Oblast
- Headquarters: Magadan, Magadan Oblast
- Website: https://aviakolyma.ru/

The Magadan Regional State Budgetary Institution Kolyma Aviation (Russian: Магаданское областное государственное бюджетное учреждение Авиация Колымы) is a regional airline operated by the Government of Magadan Oblast. It operates as a connector airline for smaller settlements in the Russian Far East, serving several remote and harsh areas.

The airline is funded through the regional budget and subsidies from the government of Magadan Oblast.

== History ==
In March 2024, the airline took delivery of two Mi-38 medium transport helicopters, painted in a distinctive orca livery. The two helicopters covered a distance of 6,500 km over four days between Kazan and Magadan, with stops in Chelyabinsk, Omsk, Novosibirsk, Krasnoyarsk, Bratsk, Bodaybo and Neryungri. The journey was co-piloted by Milana Smerdova, the first female qualified pilot on the Mi-38.

On 14 March 2024, two Mi-8AMT helicopters rendered medical assistance to a crashed Dalnerechensk Avia Mi-8 which had performed a hard landing 75 km from Evensk, Severo-Evensky Raion, Magadan Oblast.

In May 2025, the airline took part in the Magadan Immortal Regiment commemoration, with aircraft decorated with images of pilots of the Great Patriotic War.

== Fleet ==
As of October 2025, Kolyma Aviation operates 10 fixed wing and rotary aircraft. Several aircraft are painted in a distinctive orca livery.

Kolyma Aviation Fleet
Aircraft	In service	Orders	Notes
Antonov An-74	1		
SibNIA TVS-2	1		
Mil Mi-38	2		Delivered in 2024.
Mil Mi-8	4		2 Mi-8AMT delivered in 2021. 2 Mi-8MTV-1 leased from GTLK delivered in 2024.
Kazan Ansat	2		Includes equipment for medical evacuation flights. Delivered in 2025

In addition, the company possesses several drones including:

- ZALA-421 16-T
- DJI Matrice 300
- Autel EVO MAX 4T
