= Mil Mi-38 =

2003 transport helicopter family by Mil

Mi-38
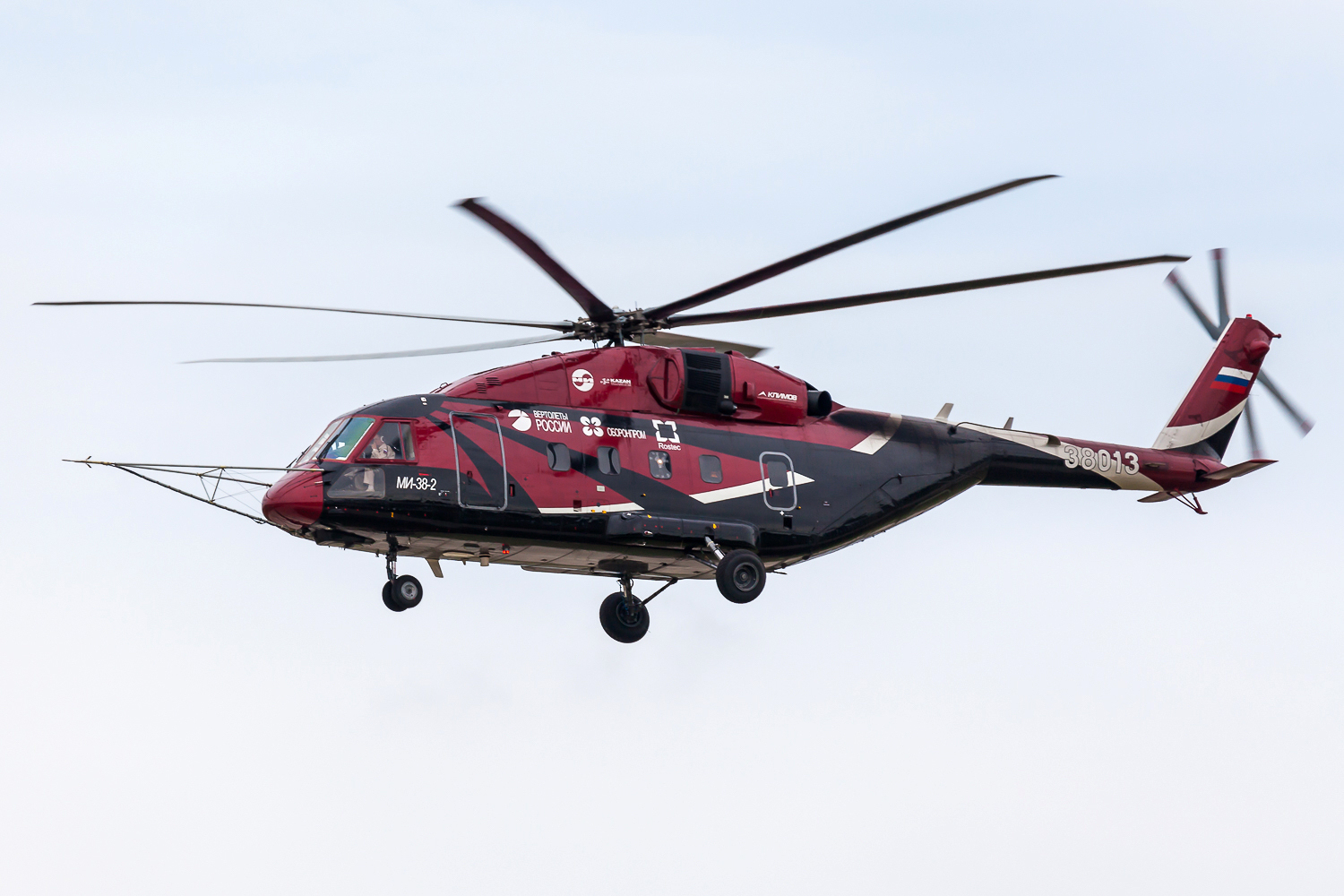
- A Mi-38 (OP-3) at HeliRussia 2011

General information
- Type: Medium transport helicopter
- National origin: Russia
- Manufacturer: Kazan Helicopters
- Designer: Mil Moscow Helicopter Plant
- Status: In service
- Primary users: Russian Air Force Myanmar Air Force
- Number built: 16 (4 prototypes, 12 serial production units)

History
- Manufactured: 2003–present
- Introduction date: 2 December 2019 (Mi-38T)
- First flight: 22 December 2003
- Variant: Mi-38T

The Mil Mi-38 is a transport helicopter designed by Mil Moscow Helicopter Plant and being developed by Kazan Helicopters. Originally intended as a replacement for the Mil Mi-8 and the Mi-17, it is being marketed in both military and civil versions. It flew for the first time on 22 December 2003 and was certified on 30 December 2015.

== History ==
Kazan Helicopters began developing the Mi-38 in the early 1980s. A mockup was first shown during the 1989 Paris Air Show. After the dissolution of the Soviet Union in 1991, Kazan Helicopters began collaborating with Eurocopter to adapt the Mi-38 for the international market. In September 1994, Euromil JSC was established and funding of the programme began a month later. Sextant and Pratt & Whitney Canada were also to participate in the programme as suppliers of Mi-38's avionics and powerplant equipment. Initially, the helicopter was to be first flight tested in 1999, but only on 18 August 1999 a contract was signed for completion of the first demonstrator. In 2001, testing of Mi-38's rotor blades was carried out on a Mi-17 helicopter. The first Mi-38 demonstrator (PT-1) performed its maiden flight above the Kazan Helicopters plant on 22 December 2003.

The second prototype (OP-2), powered by Pratt & Whitney Canada PW127/TS engines, made its first flight on 2 December 2010. The prototype is also equipped with the IBKO-38 or IBKV-38 aviation complex, developed by Transas Aviation, which implements a concept of a glass cockpit for the Mi-38. The same month, OP-2 performed its first long-haul flight from Kazan to Moscow, which covers more than 800 km (500 mi).

In March 2013, the Fédération Aéronautique Internationale has confirmed the Mi-38 prototypes have already set five records in the E1h class. The second prototype aircraft set an altitude record by reaching 8,620 metres (28,280 ft) without a payload. The second and third records were for climbing speed; the Mi-38 reached a height of 3,000 metres (9,800 ft) in six minutes, then followed this to reach 6,000 metres (20,000 ft) in 10 minutes and 52 seconds. Two further records were altitude records: the first was set at 7,895 metres (25,902 ft) with a 1,000 kg (2,200 lb) payload, the second at 700 metres (2,300 ft) with a 2,000 kg (4,400 lb) payload.

The third prototype (OP-3), began its flight tests on 17 December 2013. The helicopter is equipped with a pair of Russian Klimov TV7-117V turboshaft engines, which produce about 2,100 kW (2,800 shp) as opposed to 1,900 kW (2,500 shp) for the Pratt & Whitney Canada PW127/TS.

The fourth and final prototype (OP-4), first took off on 16 October 2014. Same as the OP-3, it is powered by Klimov TV7-117V engines but differs from the third prototype by its impact-resistant fuel system and enlarged portholes.

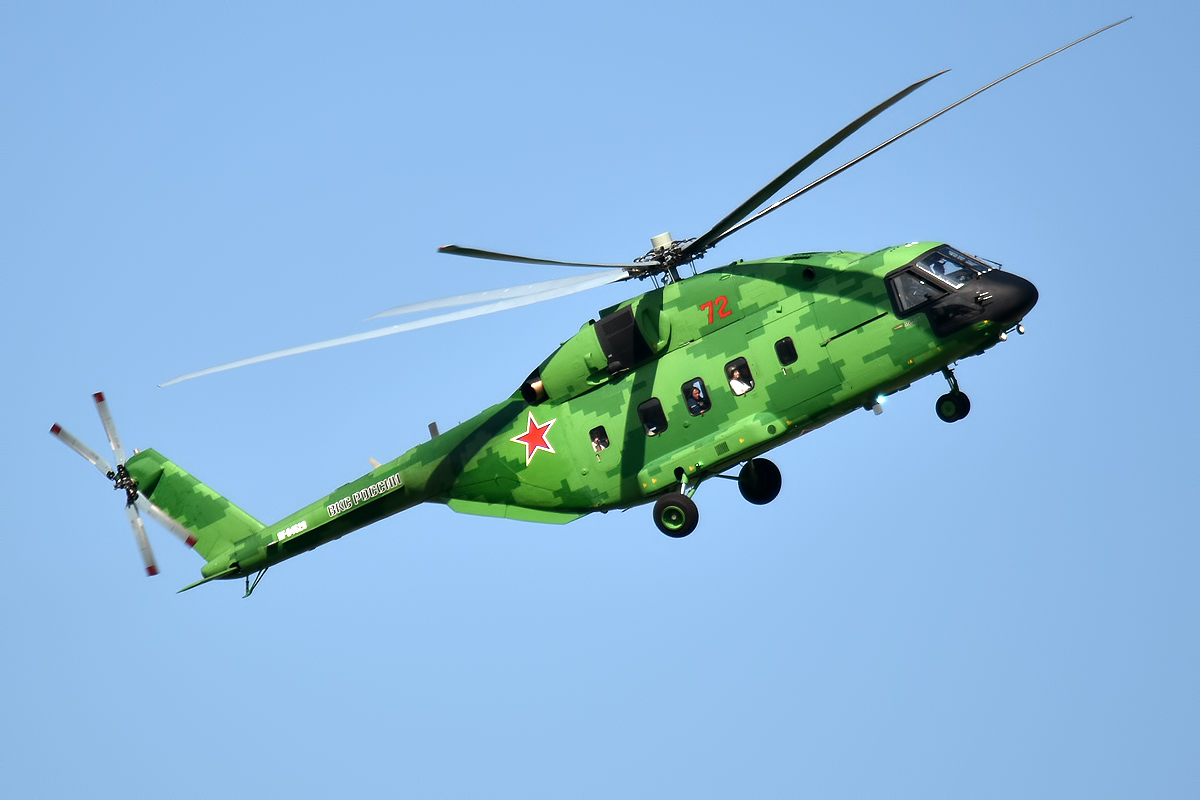
An Mi-38T of the Russian Aerospace Forces.

On 30 December 2015, Rosaviatsiya certified the Mi-38, completing the testing and certification program and allowing for the delivery of the first production model. Certification was based on the third and fourth flight-test prototypes with 1,900 kW (2,500 shp) Klimov TV7-117V engines.

In July 2017, a contract for delivery of first two serial Mi-38s to the Russian Defence Ministry was signed. The Kazan Helicopters plant launched the serial production of the helicopter on 10 January 2018. In total, the Russian Defence Ministry planned to purchase about 15 helicopters until 2020.

On 23 November 2018, military variant, Mi-38T, performed its maiden flight. The new variant was developed to meet the Russian MoD's new requirements for the helicopter and due to international sanctions imposed on Russia, all of its components, including engines and avionics, are Russian-made. Deputy Managing Director at Kazan Helicopters Vadim Ligai stated that the Mi-38 can now carry up to 40 passengers. The Russian Defence Ministry took delivery of the first two serial Mi-38s in December 2019. In January 2020, Russian Helicopters announced that it had received orders from an unspecified export customer (reported by Russian media sources to be in the Middle East) for Mi-38Ts in "transport and increased comfort cabin configurations", with delivery from 2021 to 2022. The RF Defense Ministry ordered 2 more Mi-38s in increased comfort cabin configuration in August 2020 and the Ministry of Emergency Situations ordered 9 in August 2021.

== Operational history ==
In August 2021, during the International Aviation and Space Show (MAKS), the Russian Ministry of Emergency Situations signed a contract with Russian Helicopters for the delivery of nine Mi-38PS helicopters. The variant features extended range as well as the ability to be fit with modular payloads for use in the harsh environment of the Arctic. In February 2026, the delivery of the first four aircraft from the Kazan Helicopters arrived in Khabarovsk for entry into service. It was noted that the delivery of all nine helicopters was expected by the end of 2026. In May 2026 it was reported that the helicopters would be additionally deployed to new bases in the remote settlements of Sabetta, Tiksi, Dikson and Anadyr in the near future. In August 2026, the Minister of Emergency Situations stated that the delivery of a second batch of five aircraft had taken place.

In 2023, the Government of Zimbabwe was gifted an Mi-38 helicopter by Russian President Vladimir Putin from Gazprombank Leasing, during the Second Russia-Africa Summit hosted in Saint Petersburg. This follows the delivery of a number of Kazan Ansat helicopters for the Zimbabwe Republic Police, as well as a new air ambulance service for the country. However, as of 2025 the helicopter had its Russian registration restored and was returned to Russian Helicopters.

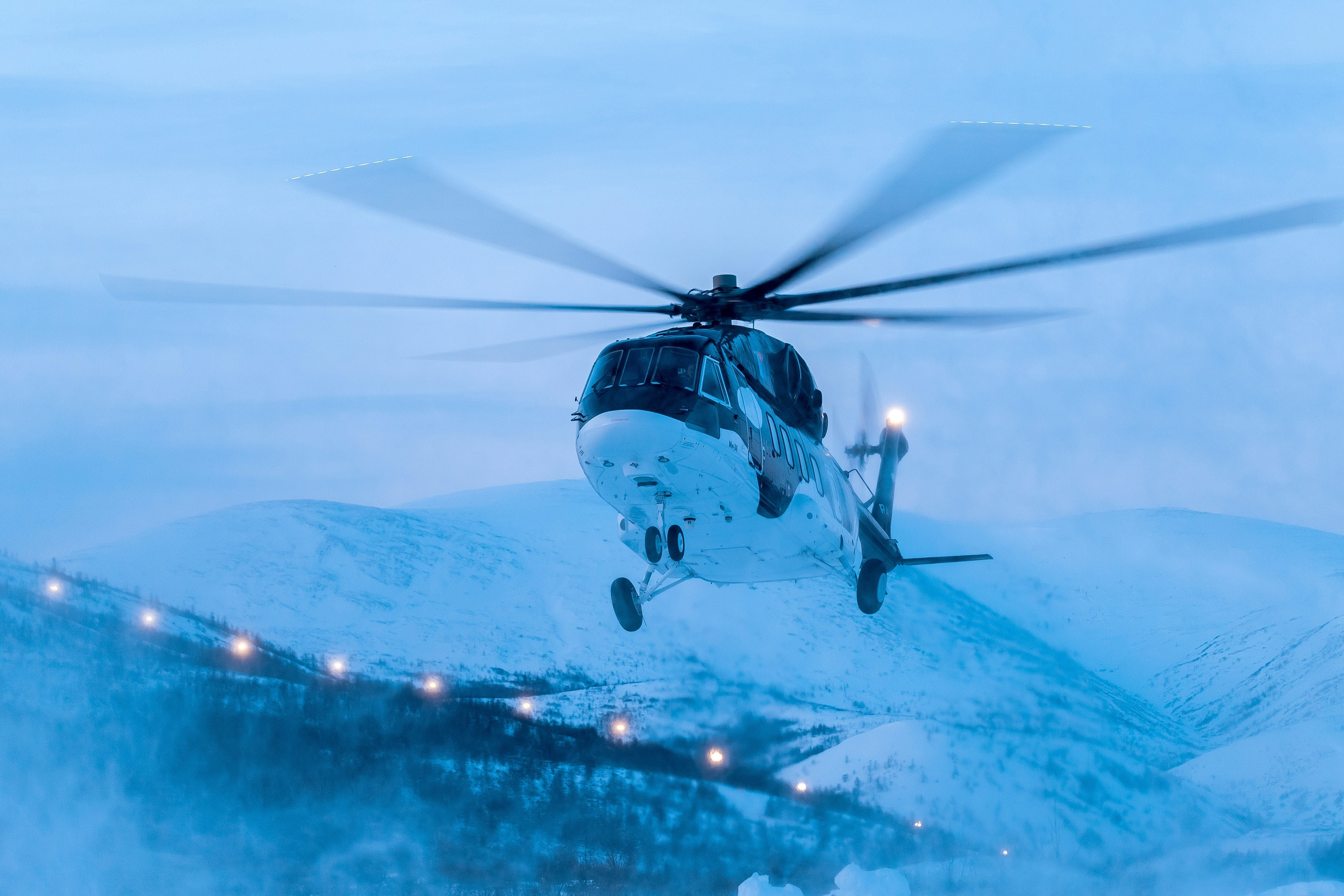
A Mi-38 operated by Kolyma Aviation.

In March 2024, Kolyma Aviation received two Mi-38-4 helicopters for operating commercial flights connecting Magadan Oblast. The aircraft were liveried in a distinctive orca pattern. The two helicopters covered a distance of 6,500 km over four days between Kazan and Magadan, with stops in Chelyabinsk, Omsk, Novosibirsk, Krasnoyarsk, Bratsk, Bodaybo and Neryungri. The journey was co-piloted by Milana Smerdova, the first female qualified pilot on the Mi-38.

In 2020 Rosboronexport reported that it had signed the first contract with a foreign customer for three Mi-38T helicopters. It was later clarified that the first foreign customer was a Southeast Asian country. However the delivery of the helicopters was delayed as a result of issues with the Klimov TV7-117 engine as well as political developments in the region. On 7 November 2025, the introduction of three Mi-38T helicopters in addition to two Shaanxi Y-8 transport aircraft was officially announced by the Myanmar Air Force. Two are configured for troop transport and one for VIP, with the helicopters intended to complement the services existing fleet of Mi-17 helicopters, bolstering its ability to deploy troops to remote regions of the country.

== Variants ==
Mi-38-1
Western version of the Mi-38, powered by Pratt & Whitney PW127TS engines. Flew to an altitude above 8,000 m (26,000 ft) in flight testing.
Mi-38-2
Russian version of the Mi-38, powered by Klimov TV7-117V engines.
Mi-38T
Russian military version of the Mi-38.

Mi-38PS

Search and rescue aircraft in service with the Russian Ministry of Emergency Situations. The aircraft is fitted with additional fuel tanks for a range of up to 1,500 km and an increased maximum takeoff weight of 16,500 kg. The aircraft can be fit with modular components for search and rescue, medical evacuation or transport.

== Operators ==
=== Military operators ===
Myanmar

- Myanmar Air Force - In 2020, the government of Myanmar signed an order with Rosboronexport for the supply of Mi-38 helicopters. Myanmar operates 3 Mi-38T as of 2026 with two configured for troop transport and one for VIP.

Russia

- Federal Protective Service
- Russian Air Force
- Russian Ministry of Emergency Situations (EMERCOM) - 9 Mi-38PS in service as of August 2026.

=== Civil operators ===
Russia

- Barguzin Airlines - 2 Mi-38-2 based in Ulan-Ude, Buryatia.
- Kolyma Aviation - 2 Mi-38-4 as of 2025. Configured for civil passenger service.

== Specifications (Mi-38) ==
Data from Mi-38 booklet

General characteristics

- Crew: 2
- Capacity: 30 max / 6,000 kg (13,000 lb) internal payload / 7,000 kg (15,000 lb) external payload
- Length: 20.282 m (66 ft 7 in) excluding rotors
- Height: 6.992 m (22 ft 11 in) to top of rotor head
- Gross weight: 14,200 kg (31,306 lb)
- Max takeoff weight: 15,600 kg (34,392 lb)
- Powerplant: 2 × Klimov TV7-117V turboshaft engines, 2,100 kW (2,800 hp) each
- Main rotor diameter: 6 × 21.1 m (69 ft 3 in)
- Main rotor area: 349.67 m^{2} (3,763.8 sq ft)

Performance

- Maximum speed: 300 km/h (190 mph, 160 kn)
- Cruise speed: 250 km/h (160 mph, 130 kn)
- Range: 880 km (550 mi, 480 nmi)
- Service ceiling: 6,300 m (20,700 ft)
- Hover ceiling OGE: 3,100 m (10,200 ft)
- Disk loading: 44.6 kg/m^{2} (9.1 lb/sq ft) max
- Power/mass: 0.1675 kW/kg (0.1019 hp/lb)

== See also ==
Aircraft of comparable role, configuration, and era

- AgustaWestland AW101
- Sikorsky S-92
- Changhe Z-18
- HAL Medium Lift Helicopter
