= Kazan Helicopters =

Russian Helicopter Manufacturer

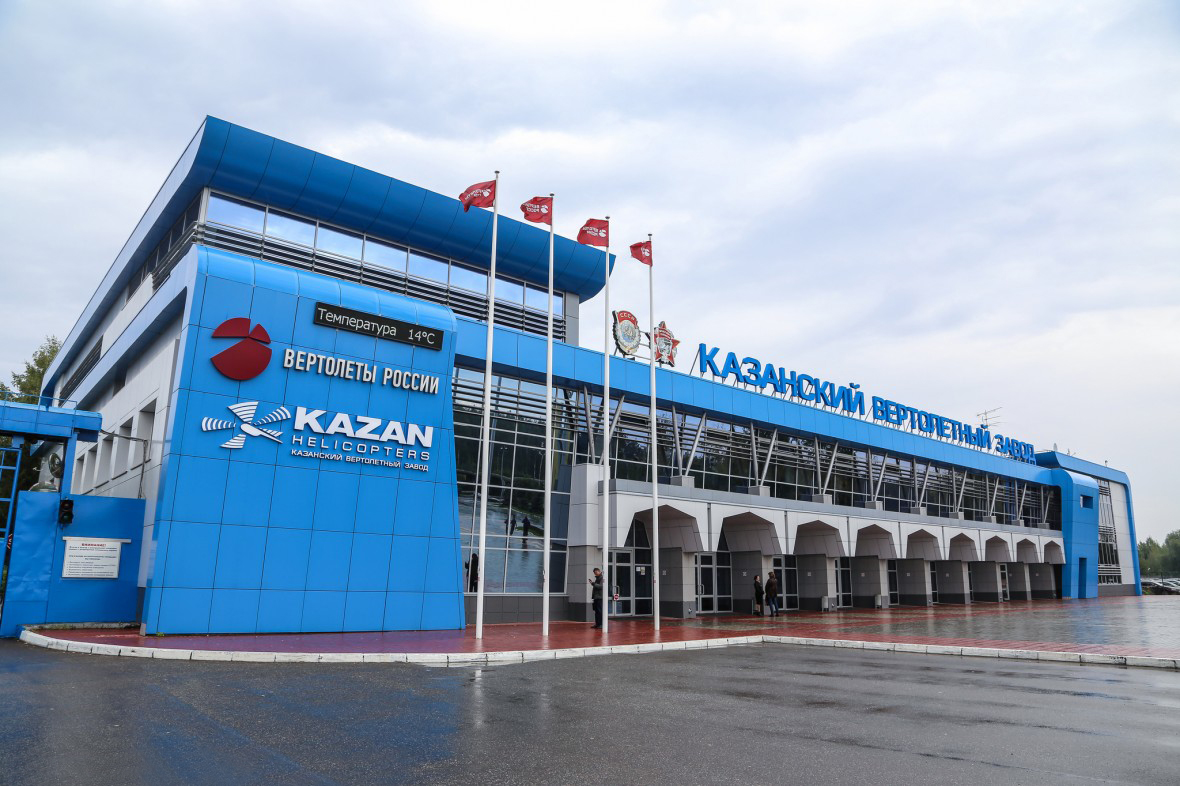
- Kazan Helicopters
- Native name: Казанский вертолётный завод
- Founded: 1940; 86 years ago
- Headquarters: Kazan, Russia
- Revenue: $377 million (2016)
- Operating income: −$29.2 million (2016)
- Net income: $1.94 million (2016)
- Total assets: $1.02 billion (2016)
- Total equity: $418 million (2016)
- Parent: Russian Helicopters

Kazan Helicopters, Joint Stock Company is a Russian helicopter manufacturing company based at Kazan, Republic of Tatarstan. It is one of the largest helicopter manufacturers in the world.

Its products include the Mil Mi-8 and Mil Mi-17 helicopters. It is the only producer of the military version of the Mi-17 helicopter. It also produces Mil Mi-38 helicopters, as well as its own models, the Kazan Ansat and Kazan Aktai.

== History ==
Kazan Helicopter plant was founded on September 4, 1940. It launched production of Mi-1 helicopters in 1951; it was the first serial production of helicopters in USSR. The plant has produced the first national exported helicopter – Mi-4, and the most popular helicopter – Mi-8. The total flight time of helicopters made by Kazan Helicopters exceeds 50 million hours. Kazan Helicopters has delivered over 12000 Mi-4, Mi-8, Mi-24, Mi-17, Ansat helicopters (and their modifications) to 100 countries of the world.

== Products ==
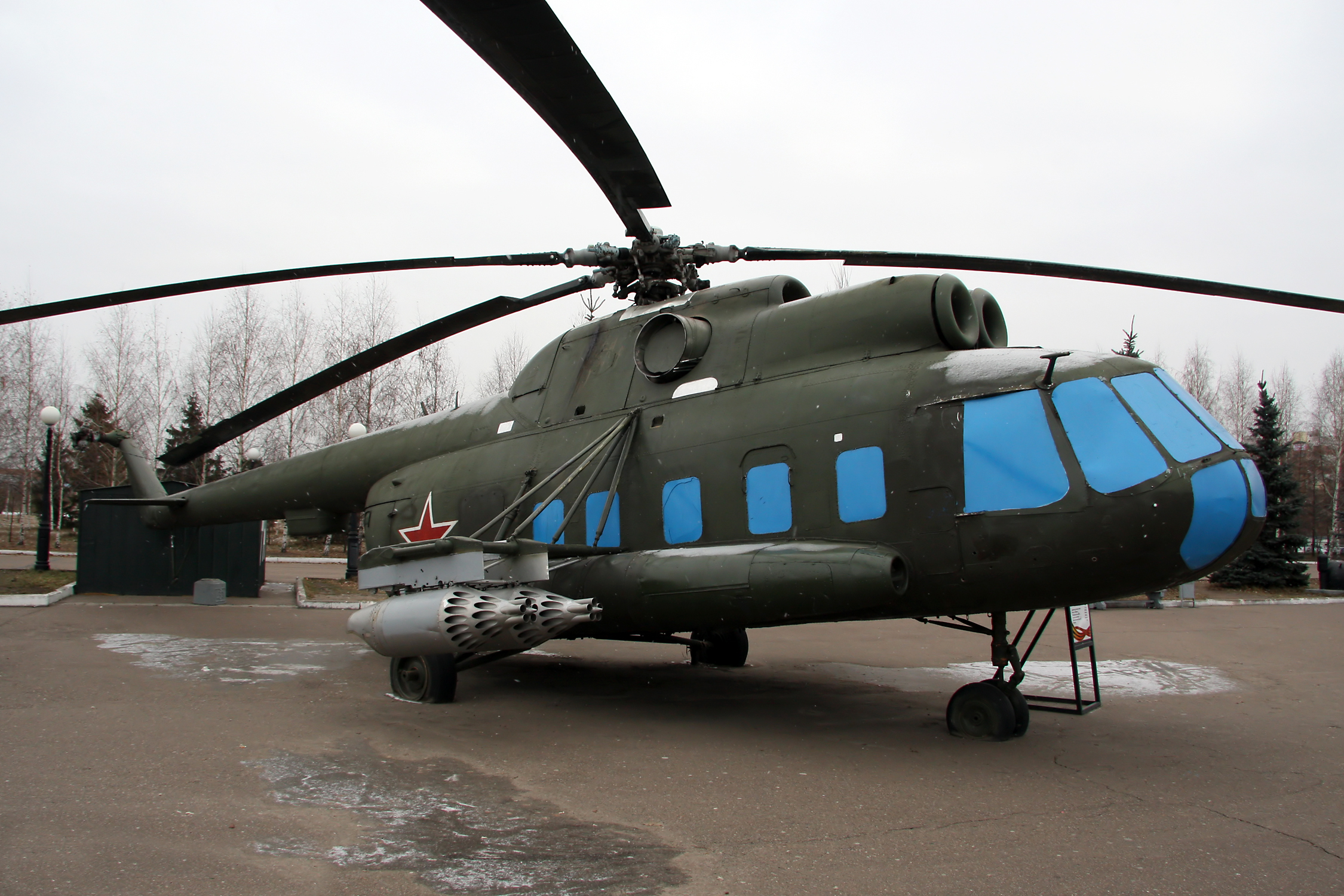
Mil Mi-8

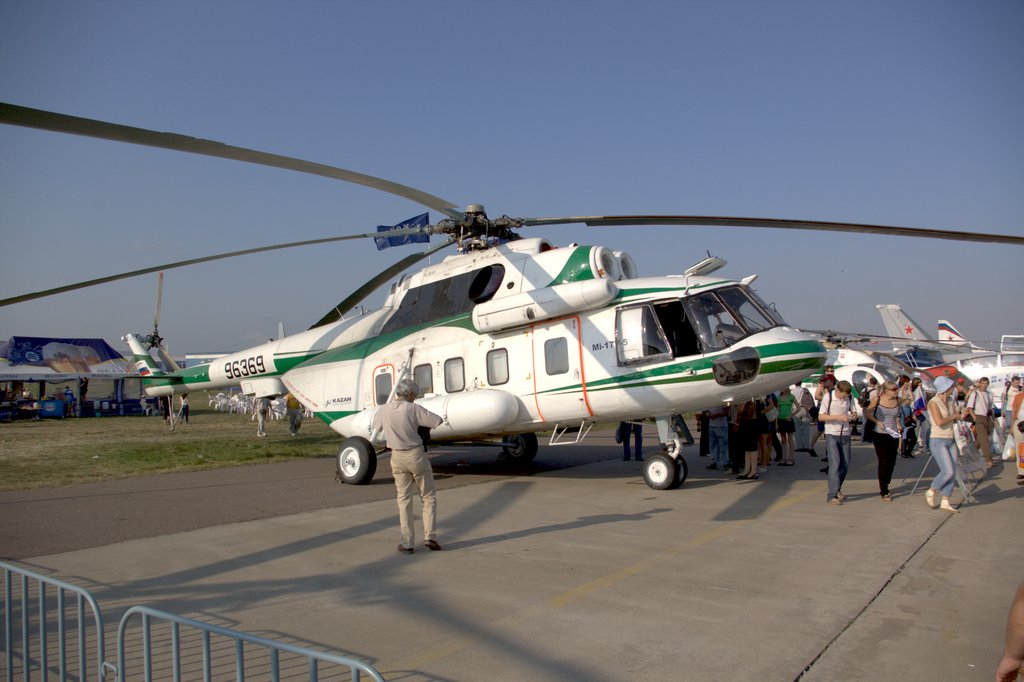
Mil Mi-17

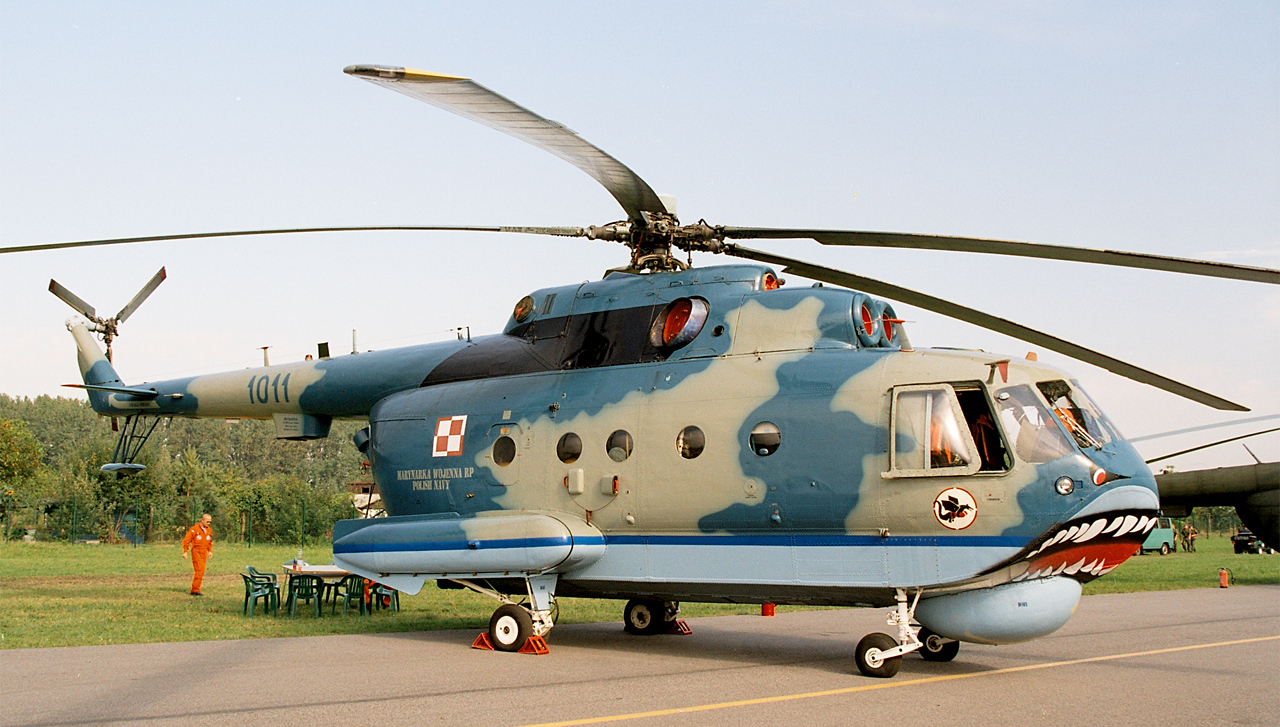
Mil Mi-14

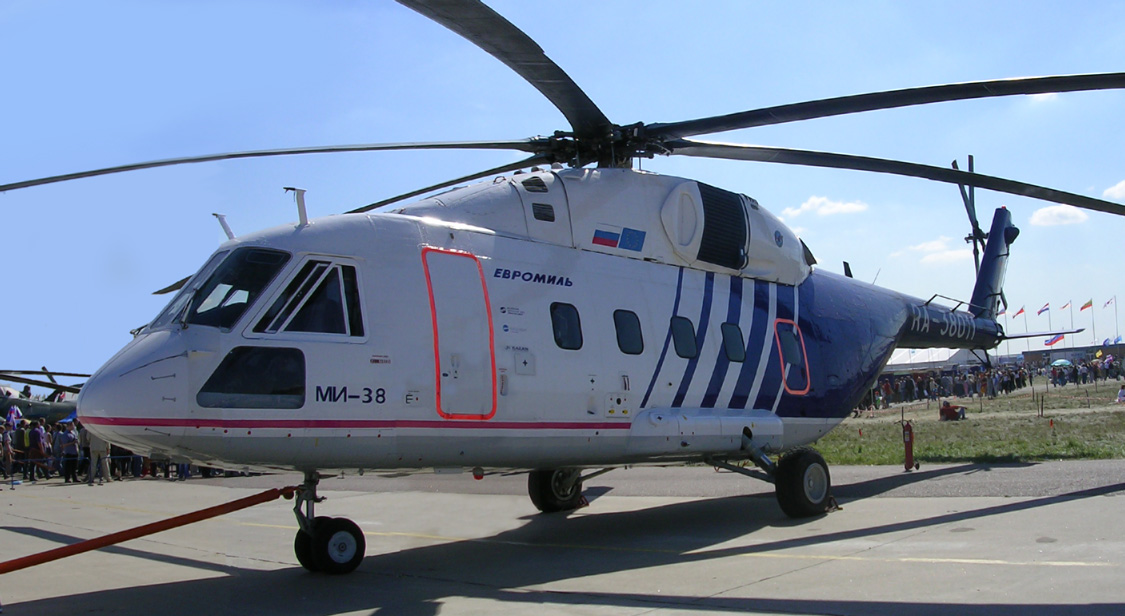
Mil Mi-38

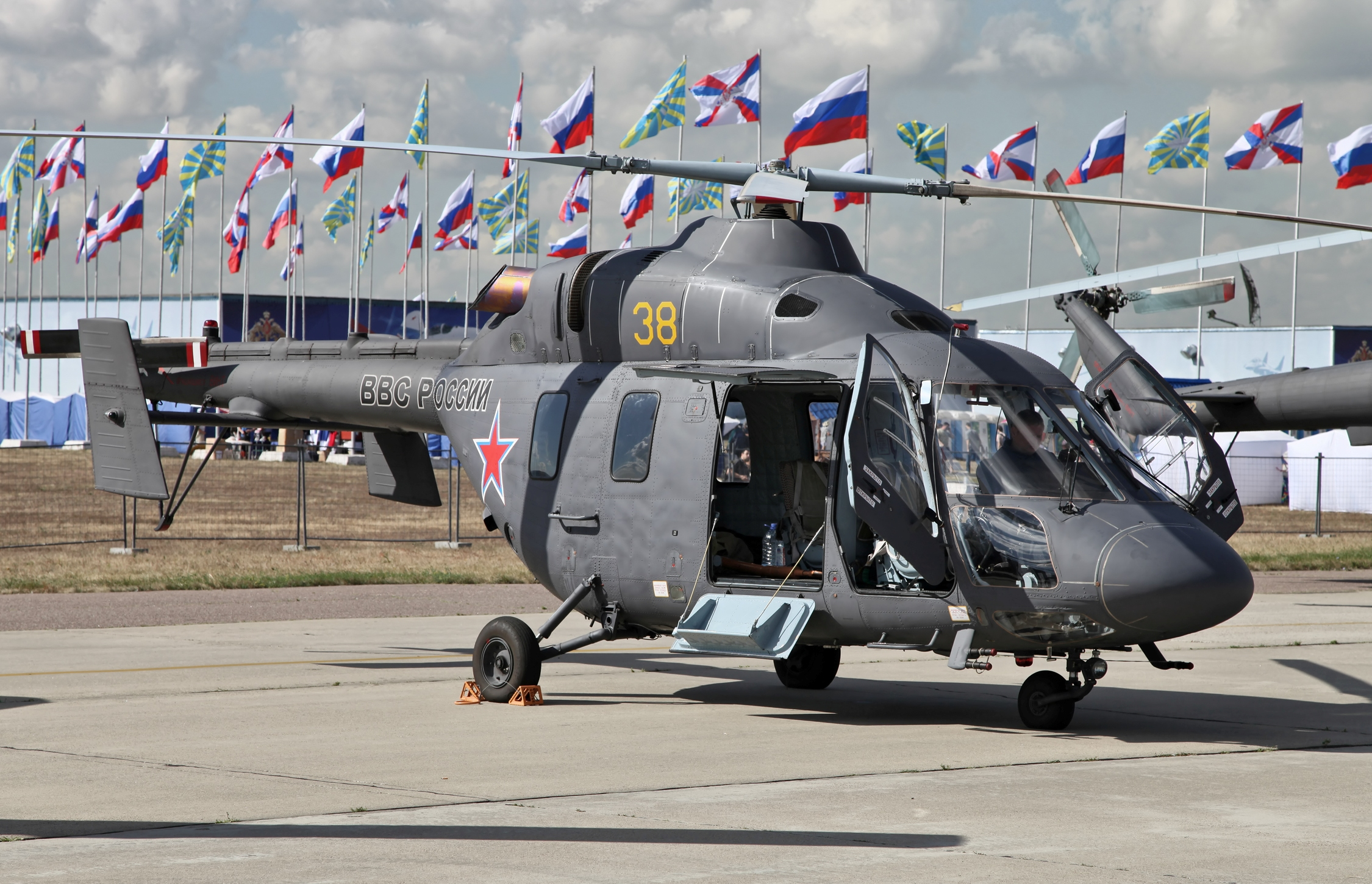
Kazan Ansat

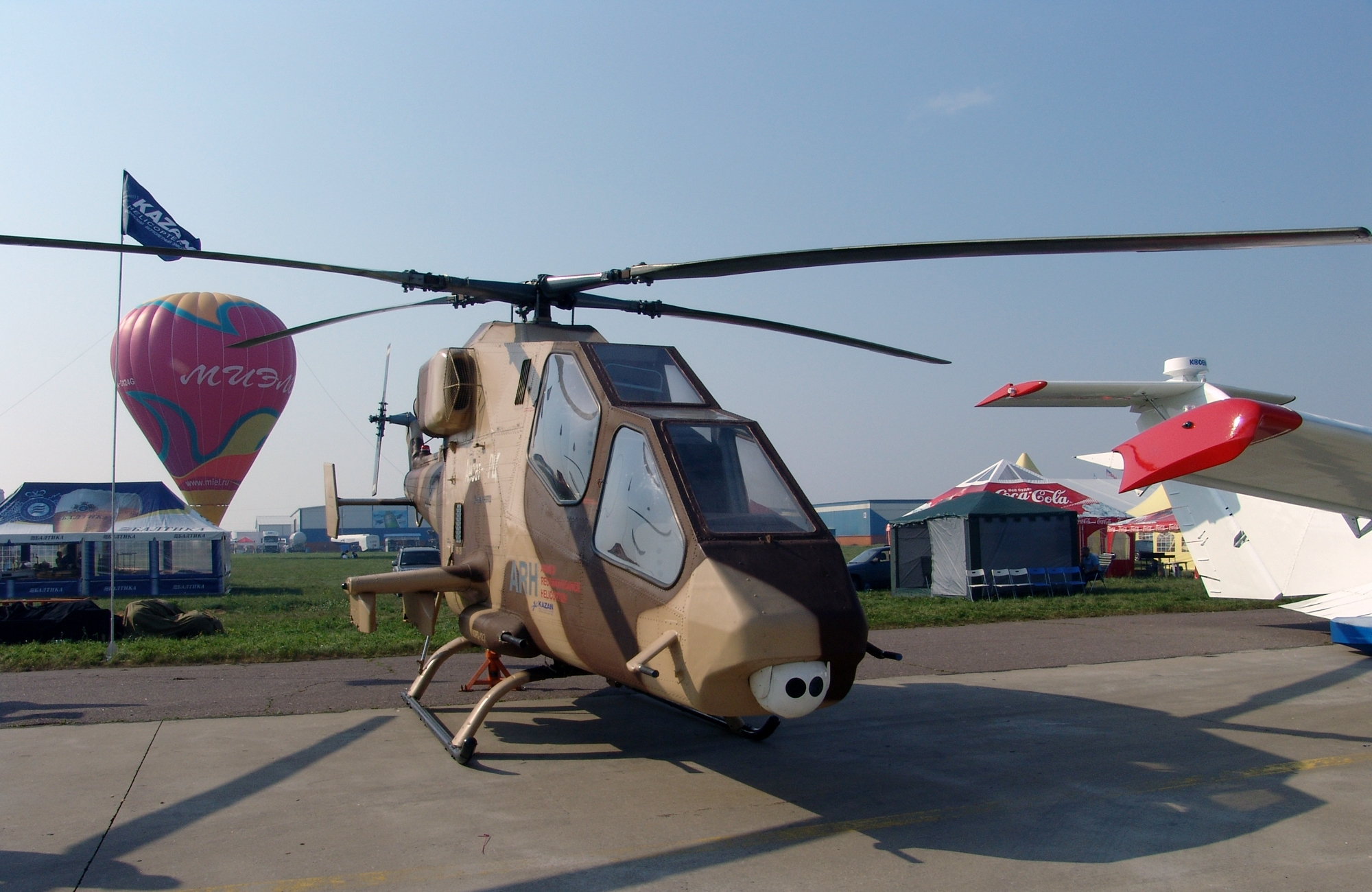
Kazan Ansat-2RC

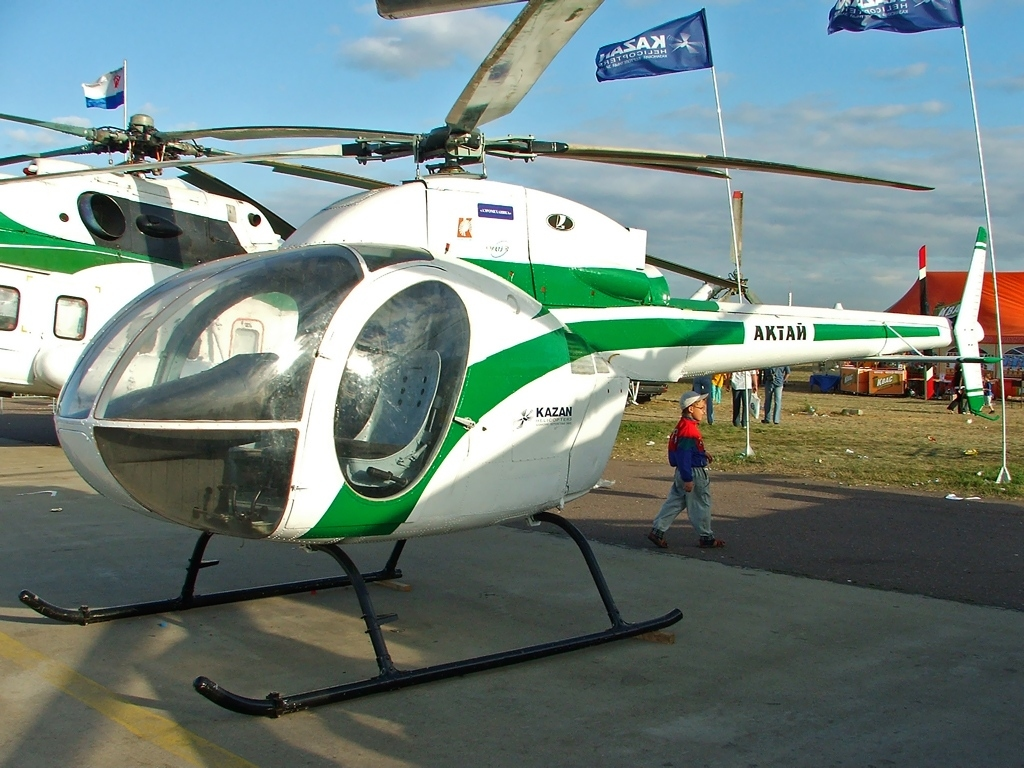
Kazan Aktai
