= National Service of Sanitary Aviation =

Russian air ambulance service

National Service of Sanitary Aviation Национальная служба санитарной авиации
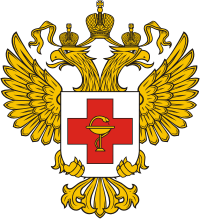

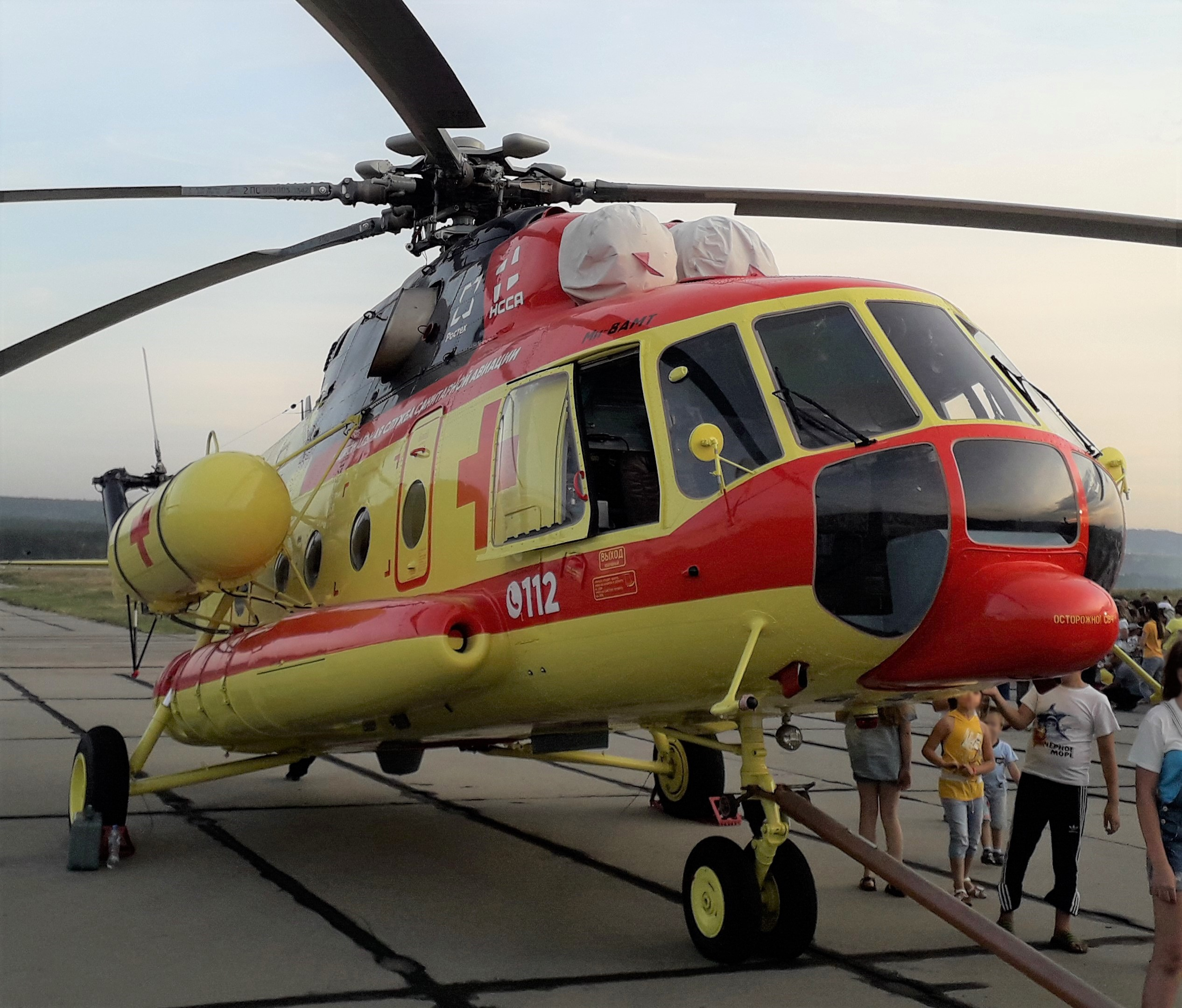
- Founded: 31 August 2017; 8 years ago
- Fleet size: 76
- Parent company: Rostec
- Headquarters: Saint Petersburg. Russia

The National Service of Sanitary Aviation - NSSA (Russian: Национальная служба санитарной авиации - НССА), informally known as the National Air Ambulance Service is the national air ambulance service of Russia. Founded in 2017, the service provides helicopter emergency medical service and is operated by Rostec.

The NSSA also works in close cooperation with the Ministry of Emergency Situations (EMERCOM).

Headquartered in Saint Petersburg, the service operates from over 130 aircraft bases and 1,500 helipads throughout the country.

== History ==
In 2016, the Government of Russia put forward a project for the development of an air ambulance service, that would standardise sanitary aviation services throughout the country. In 2017, the state corporation Rostec put forward an initiative to provide helicopters and medical equipment. To achieve this, the joint stock company JSC National Air Ambulance Service was created as a joint venture between Rostec and entrepreneur Ivan Yatsenko, an operator of helicopter services in Saint Petersburg. Rostec would later increase their share in the company to a controlling stake.

In late 2023, the NSSA reported that more than 11,000 people had been rescued in the year, including approximately 2,000 children. Over the year, the service had expanded to over 60 regions of the country, with its fleet increasing to fifty-nine Mi-8 and Ansat helicopters.

== Fleet ==
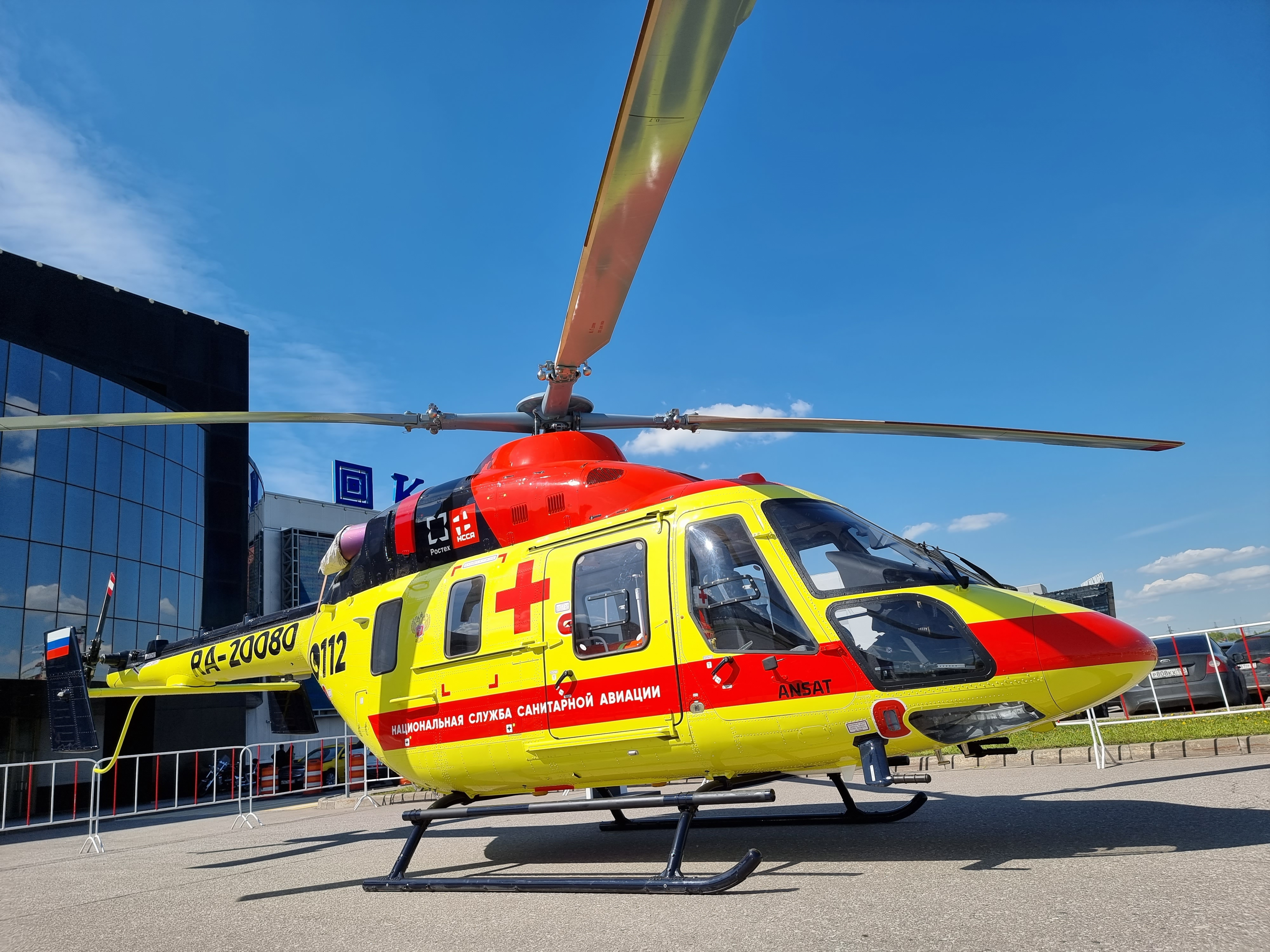
Kazan Ansat

As of March 2026, the NSSA operates a large fleet of helicopters, consisting of light Kasan Ansat helicopters for urban operations as well as medium Mil Mi-8M helicopters for more remote locations. The NSSA is the largest civilian operator of the Kasan Ansat light helicopter.

In early 2025, Rostec reported that a total of 76 helicopters were in service, with thirty-eight Ansat and thirty-eight Mi-8 operating throughout Russia.

== Accidents and incidents ==
- On 23 August 2021, a Kazan Ansat helicopter (RA-20050) was damaged after suffering from ground resonance while landing at Ivanovo Hospital.
- On 22 October 2024, a Kazan Ansat helicopter (RA-20101) was significantly damaged after making an emergency landing in a forest near Malaya Ovsyanka in Nizhny Novgorod Oblast. Both pilots, two medical crew and a patient were injured.
- On 20 February 2025, a Kazan Ansat helicopter (RA-20050) made a hard landing at Stavropol Shpakovskoye Airport after suffering a prop pitch failure.
- On 25 March 2025, a Mi-8MTV-1 helicopter (RA-22257) suffered damaged blades caused by snow removal equipment while parked at Khalaktyrka Airport.

== See also ==
- Ministry of Emergency Situations
