= Tulpar Air =

Russian airline

IATA	ICAO	Call sign
—	TUL	—
- Founded: 2004
- Hubs: Kazan
- Fleet size: 5
- Headquarters: Kazan
- Key people: Anton Sidorkin (General Manager)
- Website: http://www.tulparair.ru

Tulpar Air was based in Kazan (Tatarstan), Russia, and was established in late 2004. It is currently banned from flying in the EU.
