= Kazan Ansat =

Helicopter in Russia

Ansat
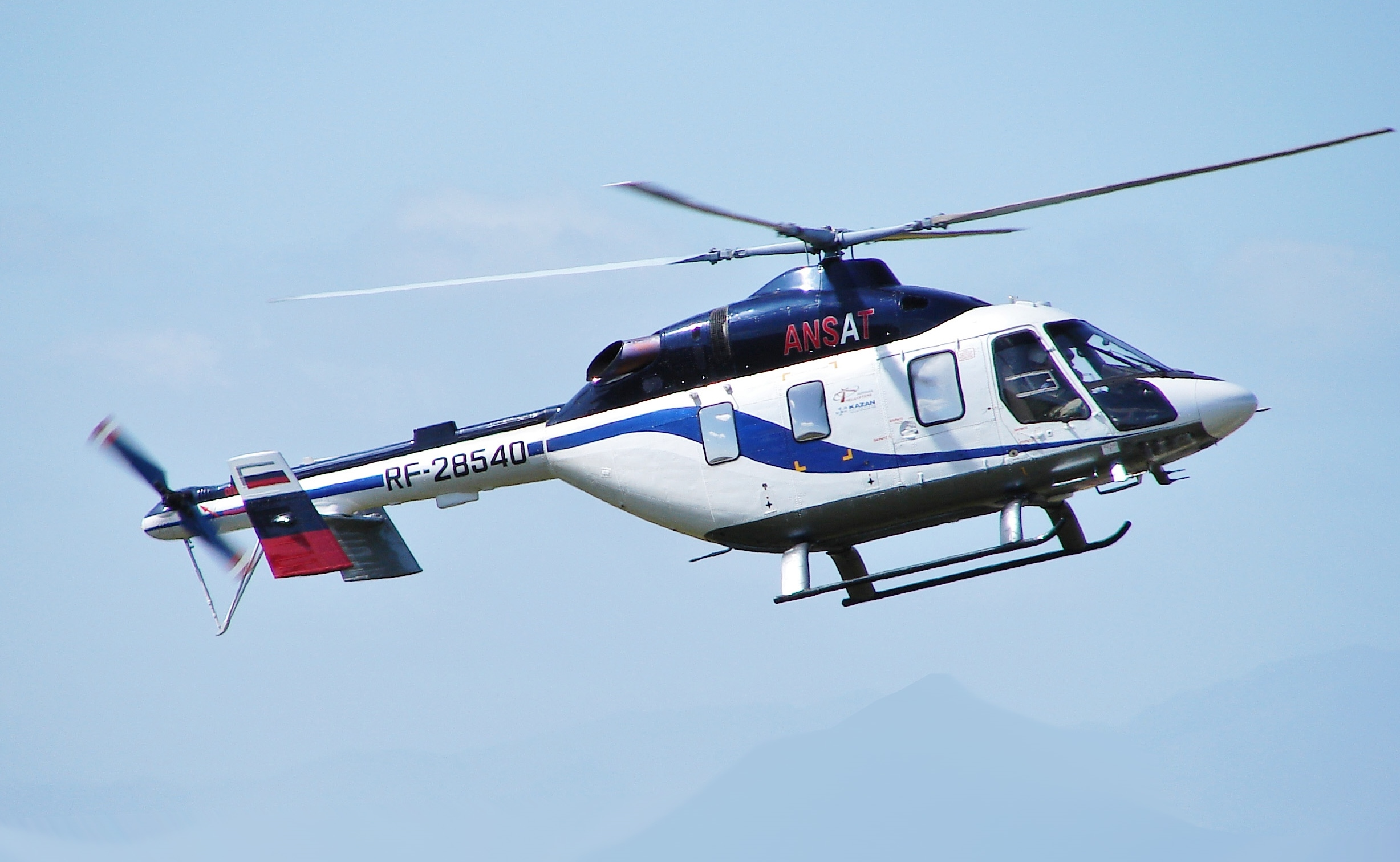
- A Kazan Ansat

General information
- Type: Multipurpose utility helicopter
- Manufacturer: Kazan Helicopters
- Status: In service
- Primary user: Russian Aerospace Forces

History
- Manufactured: 1998–present
- Introduction date: 28 August 2013
- First flight: 17 August 1999

The Kazan Ansat is a Russian light, multi-purpose helicopter manufactured by Kazan Helicopters.

== History ==
Kazan Helicopters in Kazan, Tatarstan, Russia has been one of the main Russian manufacturers of helicopters of the Mikhail Mil bureau design. In the 1990s management realized that there would be a need for light helicopters in Russia, as the fleet of standard Mi-2s was getting older, and the design itself became obsolete. The Mi-2 was the lightest helicopter in large-scale use in the former USSR, despite being larger than most light Western helicopters. At first Kazan Helicopters wanted to develop a helicopter based on the AS 350 Ecureuil in cooperation with Eurocopter, but it failed. As a result, in 1993 Kazan Helicopters organized its own design bureau in order to create a new helicopter (the bureau was officially certified by the Russian authorities in January 1997, designer Valery Dvoeglazov). The helicopter was named Ansat (meaning "light", "simple" or "easy" in the Tatar language).

In 1998 the first prototype for ground static tests was completed. The second prototype (no. 02, then 902) first flew on August 17, 1999, but the first official flight was made on October 6, 1999. It was powered by two Pratt & Whitney Canada PW206 engines. Another prototype, with a longer and slimmer fuselage, and powered by two PW207K engines, flew on December 27, 2001 (no. 03, then 904). From 2002 it was undergoing the certification process. The third prototype introduced clam shell doors for the cabin opening upwards and downwards, instead of the sliding ones. It was offered as the Ansat-U military trainer variant with dual controls.

In September 2001, the Ansat-U won a contest for a trainer helicopter for the Russian Air Force. By 2010 four were in service with the Russian Air Force's Syzran Military Pilot Flying Training School. A further 20 are planned, to be powered by Ukrainian Motor Sich MS-500V engines replacing the Pratt & Whitney engines of the first four Ansats. New light multi-purpose civilian helicopter "ANSAT" with hydromechanical control system of JSC "Kazan Helicopter Plant" has received type certification of Aviation Register of the Interstate Aviation Committee (IAC) on 28 August 2013. Type Certificate of IAC AR, allowing (freight) helicopters to begin commercial operation, was obtained in August 2013. In December 2014, IAC AR issued the approval of the main changes (addition to the type certificate), allowing for the transportation of the passengers on the commercial market. The emergence of medical options was the final step in creating a unified helicopter, certified for transport and medical works, transportation of people. Earlier, versions of these helicopters were used by the Ministry of Defense, Ministry of Emergency Situations, Ministry of Internal Affairs, FSB and other state structures of Russia.

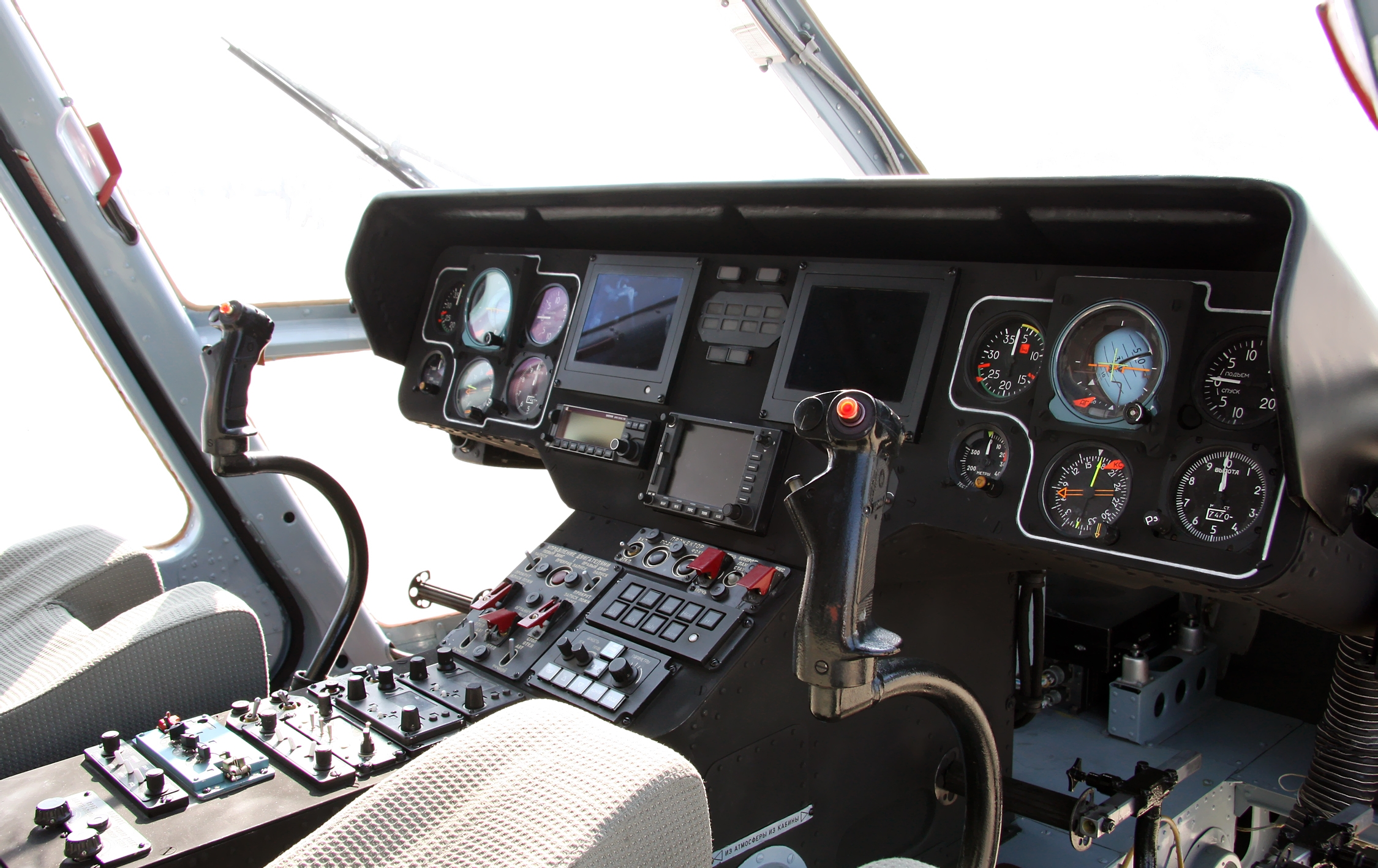
Ansat-U cockpit

A VIP version of the Ansat helicopter was certified on 31 December 2015 and with a cabin in the style of the Aurus luxury cars brand in early February 2020. The helicopter is equipped with hydromechanical control system and its passenger cabin can accommodate up to seven energy-absorbing passenger seats. There is also a ventilation and air conditioning system. According to General Director at Kazan Helicopter Plant Vadim Ligai, work is underway to modernize the helicopter's fuel system and install additional 200 kg fuel tanks in order to increase its flight range.

On 28 October 2016, Russian Helicopters has presented a civilian version of the Ansat helicopter.

In 2017–2018, the helicopter has been certified for operation under extremely cold and high temperatures from minus 45°С to plus 50°С, during a series of ground and flight testing. In January 2019, on the basis of trials conducted at Mount Elbrus in 2018, the Federal Air Transport Agency certified the increase in take-off/landing altitude of the Ansat from previous 1,000 m to 3,500 m and approved the helicopter for high-altitude operations. Ansat helicopter optional Emergency Floatation System certified in March 2020. Since May 2020, a specially-adapted medical version Ansat-SK is used in EMS operations. In December 2020, the first flight of the modernized Ansat-M took place. The installations of a winch with a lifting capacity of up to 272 kg and an external sling for carrying oversized cargo and extinguishing fires were certified in April 2021 and the installation of an external fuel tank increasing range by 140 km in December 2021.

=== Procurement ===
The Russian Defence Ministry placed an order for eight Ansat-U military helicopters in 2009–2010, becoming the initial launch customer of the variant. On 1 March 2011, it ordered another 32 Ansat-U helicopters. Under a third contract signed on 5 June 2017, ten more Ansat-U helicopters were ordered. The Russian Aerospace Forces received the last batch of Ansat-U helicopters on 20 December 2017. All Ansat helicopters of the Russian Aerospace Forces are operated by the Syzran Higher Military Aviation School, a branch of the Zhukovsky – Gagarin Air Force Academy.

On 22 May 2015, during the VIII International Helicopter Industry Exhibition HeliRussia 2015, Russian Helicopters concluded two contracts for supply of five modernized light passenger Ansat helicopters. Three of these helicopters will be delivered to the Tatarstan airline Tulpar Helicopters and two to the Vector Aviation company.

On 27 December 2016, Russian Helicopters and State Transport Leasing Company (GTLK) agreed on supply of six Ansat helicopters equipped with medical modules. GTLK has ordered additional 31 medical helicopters, including 12 Ansat on 6 December 2017. The deliveries of the later were completed in 2018. These helicopters are operated by the Russian Helicopter Systems company as emergency medical service transports.

During the 2018 Hydroaviasalon exhibition, subsidiaries of Rostec State Corporation — Russian Helicopters, National Service of Medical Aviation and Avia Capital Services LLC — signed a contract to supply 104 Ansat and 46 Mi-8AMT medically equipped helicopters.

Russian Helicopters and Chinese Association for Disaster & Emergency Rescue Medicine (CADERM) inked a contract for supply of 20 Ansat helicopters at the Airshow China 2018 exhibition. The helicopter was certified in China in early 2020.

On 16 May 2019, within the XII International Helicopter Industry Exhibition HeliRussia 2019, Russian Helicopters and Polar Airlines signed a contract for supply of seven Ansat helicopters.

On 20 January 2020, Eritrea ordered two Ansat-U military helicopters with deliveries scheduled for 2020.

In early 2020, the Republika Srpska Ministry of Interior in Bosnia and Herzegovina ordered three Ansat helicopters for its police force, with deliveries planned for 2020–2022.

== Design ==
The Ansat is of a classic layout with a pilot and 10 passengers (one of them seated next to the pilot). The fuselage has a pair of doors in pilot's cab, and a pair of upwards and downwards opening side doors in transport compartment. After the seats have been removed, it can take 1000 kg of cargo inside. On external hook, it can take 1300 kg of load. It is powered with two PW207K turboshaft engines, which produce 630 shp each. It features a four-blade main rotor and two-blade tail rotor.

== Variants ==
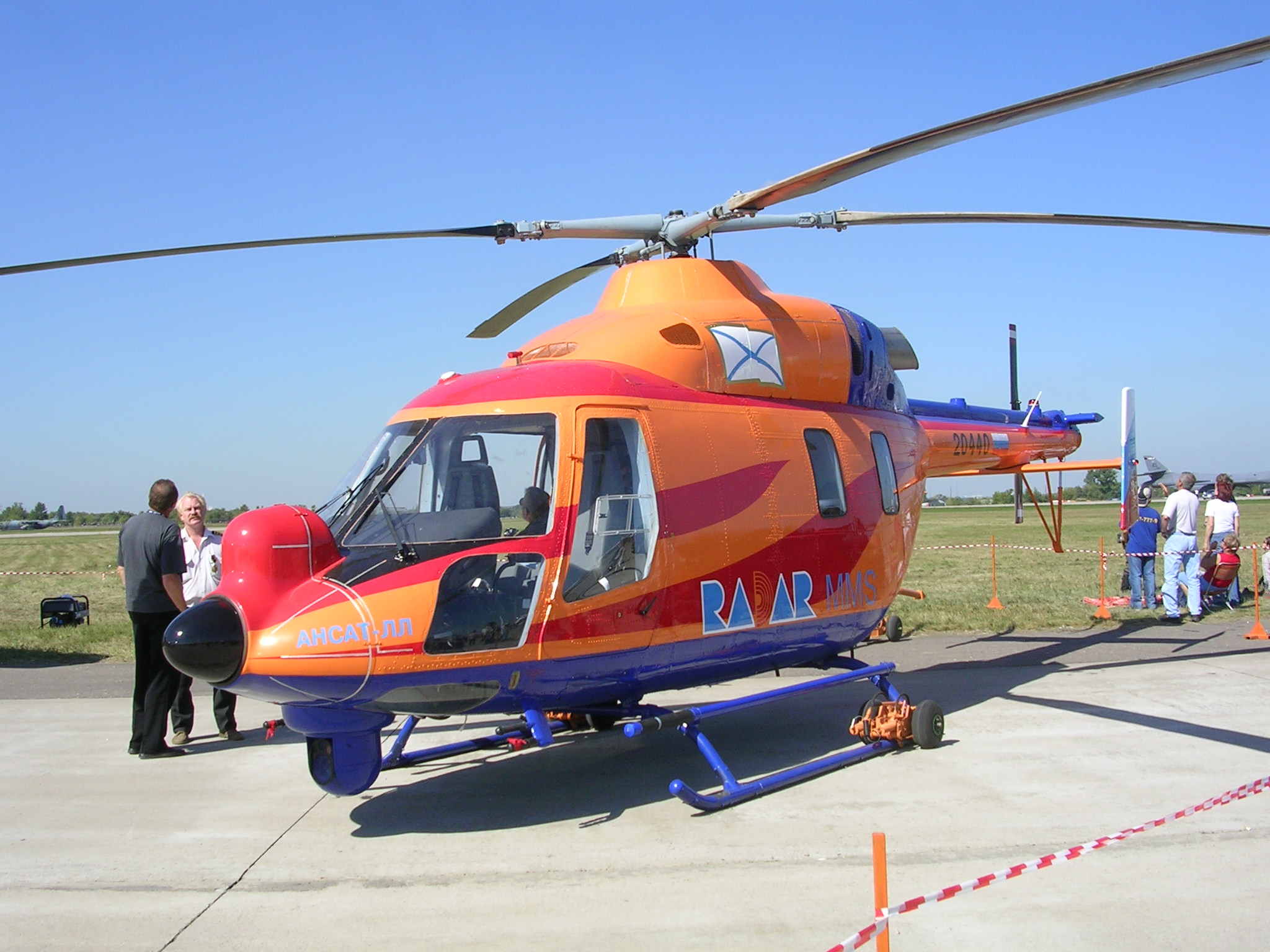
Flying laboratory Kazan Ansat-O

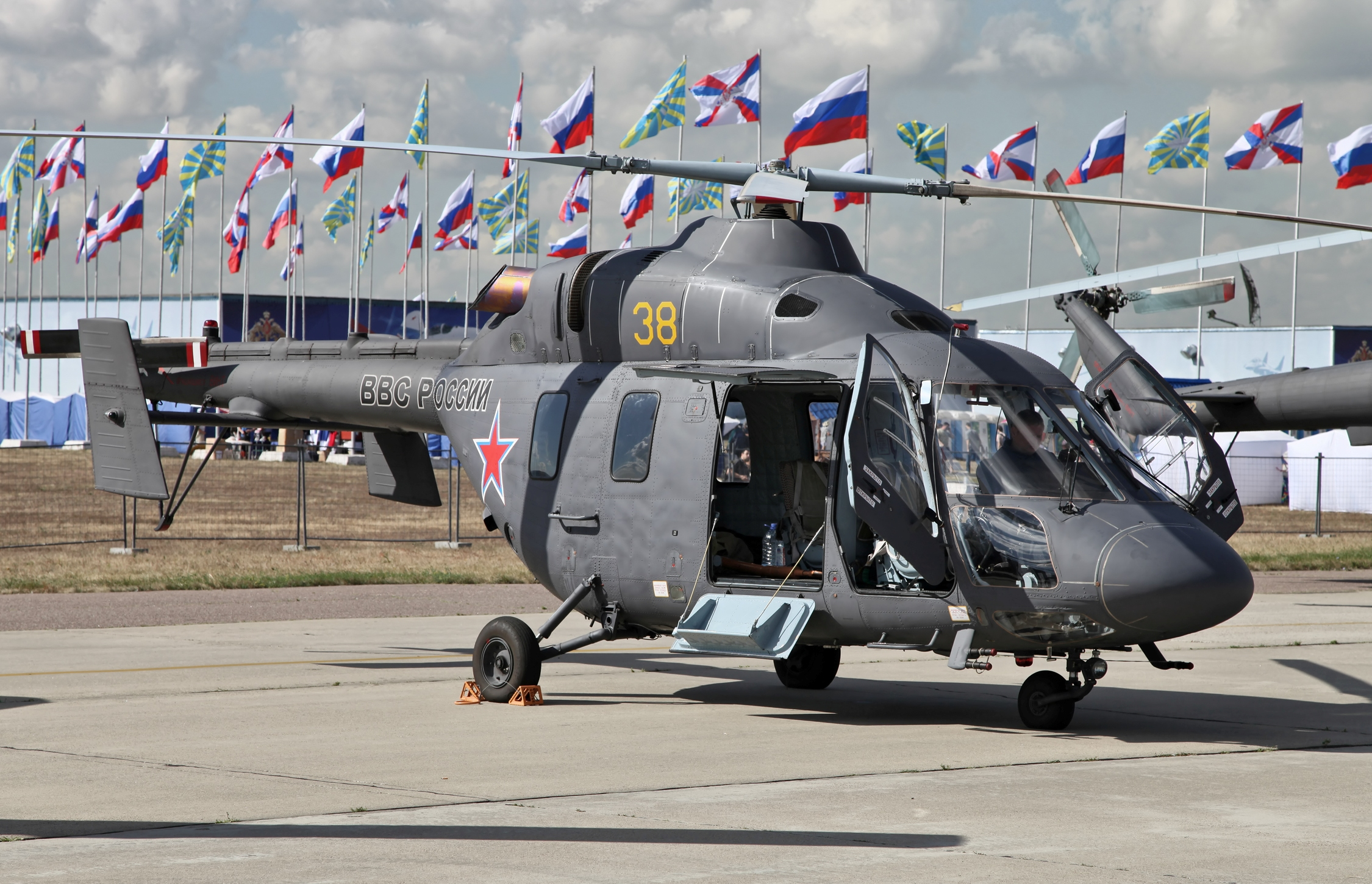
Kazan Ansat-U of the Russian Air Force

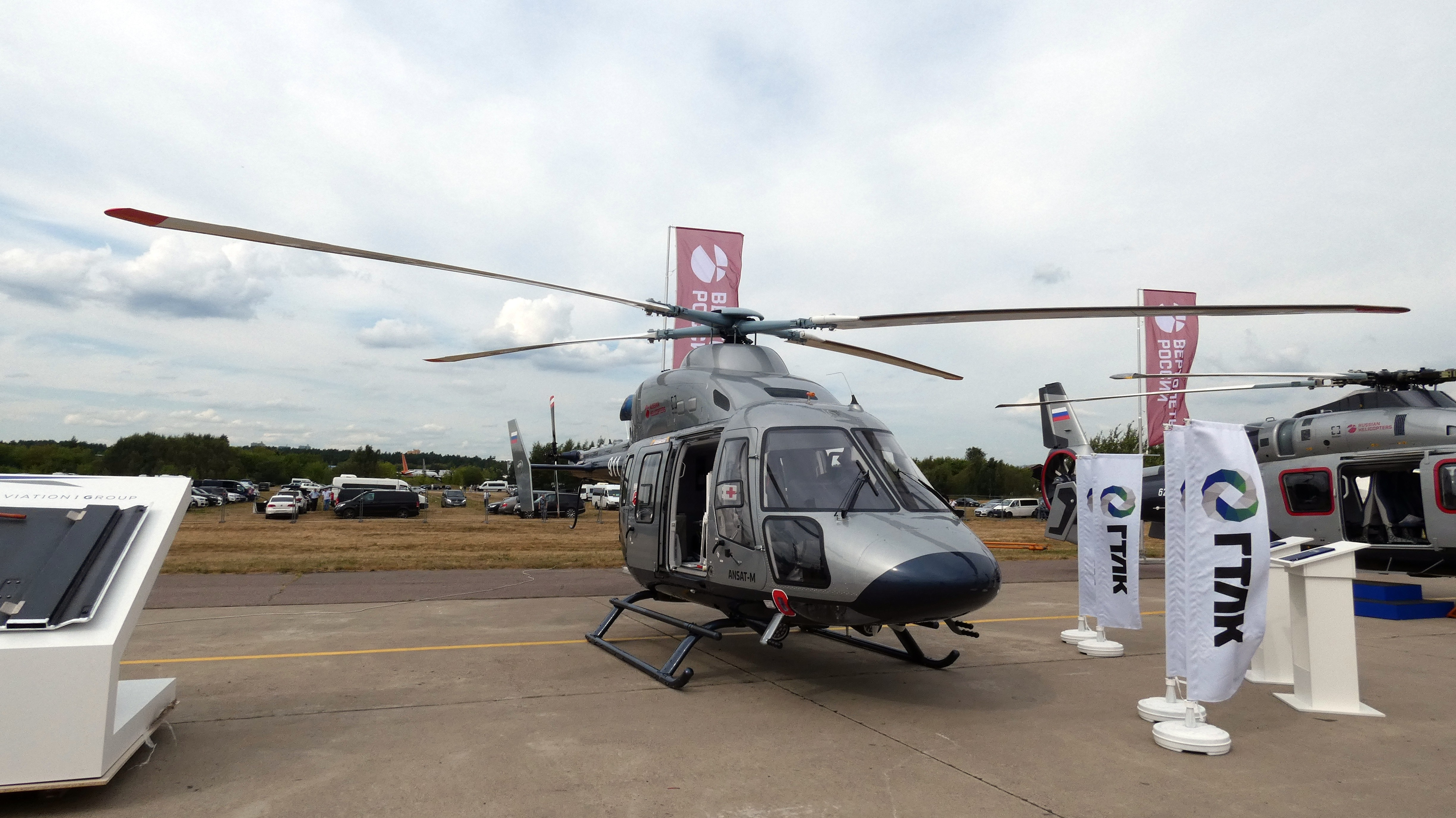
Ansat-M on MAKS-2021 airshow

External videos
- EMS helicopter operation in Zhukovsky, Russia
- Ansat-SK flight on 26 August 2023, captain Irina Dolinina, Lenin Square helipad

Ansat
Basic version, 2 prototypes built.
Ansat-M
Modernised Ansat with reduced empty weight and increased fuel. Series production planned from 2022.
Ansat-NT
Proposed further modified next-generation version, powered by two VK-800V or 520 kW (700 shp) Klimov VK-650V turboshaft engines and with new four- or five-bladed main rotor.
Ansat-O
Flying laboratory for testing of avionic equipment for naval helicopters.
Ansat-U
Special military-training version with three-wheel chassis and double-winged cargo doors.
Ansat-UM
Military medevac for 4 stretchers.
Ansat-1K
Version certified only for cargo transport.
Ansat-1M
Version with hydro-mechanical control system KSU-A instead of the fly-by-wire control system.
Ansat-SK
Version for emergency medical service (EMS) operations.

=== Derivatives ===
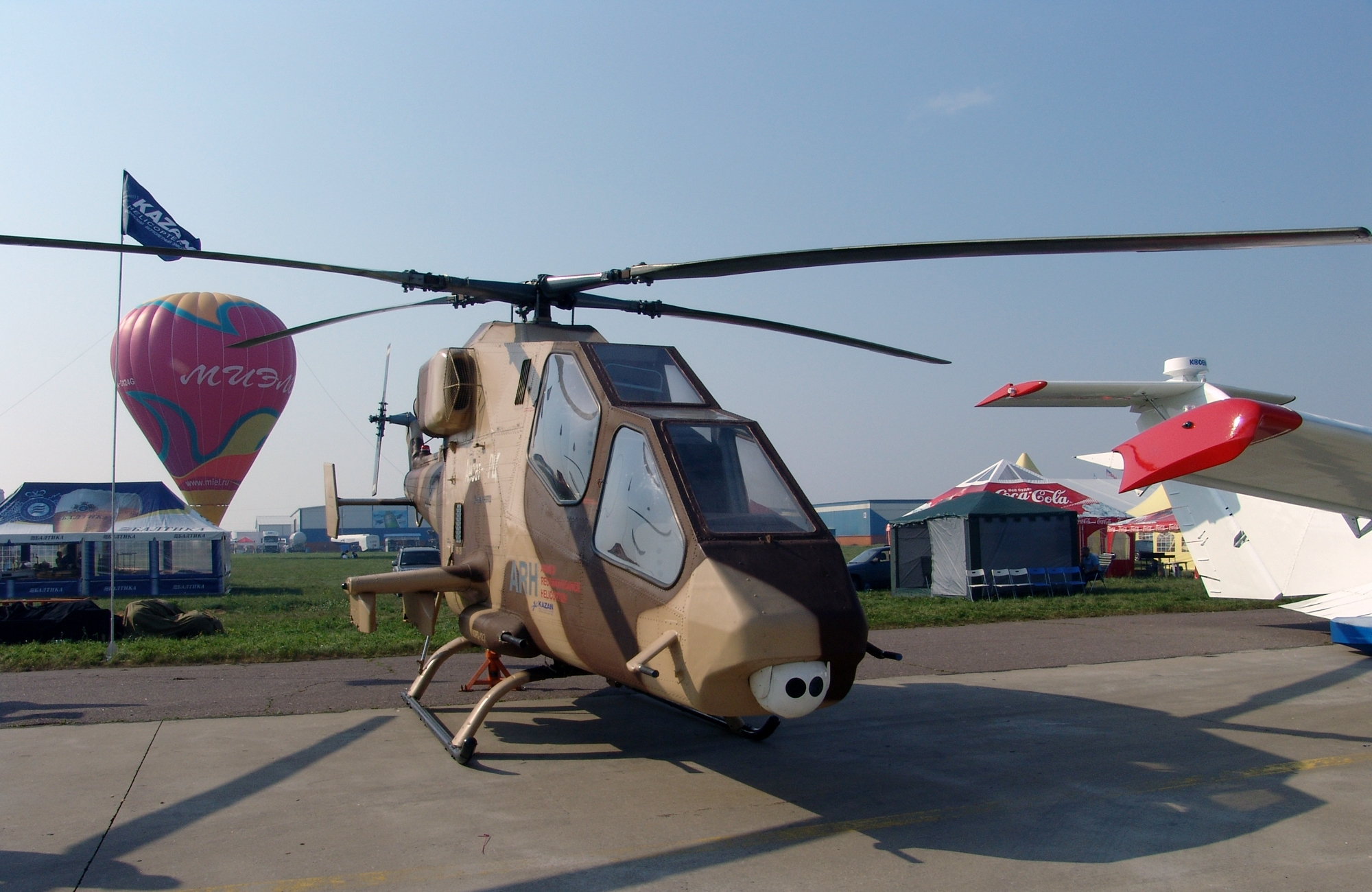
Kazan Ansat-2RC on MAKS-2007 airshow

Kazan Ansat-2RC
Derived from the civilian version and equipped with a 12.7mm (0.5 inch) machine gun above the front skid support, as well as four hardpoints spread across two stub wings. The company has already displayed the helicopter carrying a mixture of rocket launcher tubes, bombs and anti-aircraft missiles.

== Operators ==
Bosnia and Herzegovina

- Special Anti-Terrorist Unit of Republika Srpska's Ministry of Interior

China

- Chinese Association for Disaster & Emergency Rescue Medicine

Eritrea

- Eritrean Air Force

Mexico

- Craft Avia Center

Russia

- Russian Aerospace Forces
- Ministry of Emergency Situations
- Tulpar Helicopters
  - Vector Aviation
- Russian Helicopter Systems
- Polar Airlines
- Rostec State Corporation
- Russian Helicopters
- National Service of Sanitary Aviation
- Avia Capital Services LLC

Turkmenistan

- Turkmenistan Airlines

Zimbabwe

- Zimbabwe Republic Police

== Specifications ==
Data from Jane's All The World's Aircraft 2003–2004, Russian Helicopters

General characteristics

- Crew: 1–2
- Capacity: **7–8 passengers
  - 2 stretchers and 3 attendants
  - 1,235 kg (2,723 lb) internal
- Length: 13.76 m (45 ft 2 in)
- Height: 3.4 m (11 ft 2 in)
- Empty weight: 2,365 kg (5,214 lb)
- Max takeoff weight: 3,600 kg (7,937 lb)
- Fuel capacity: 535 kg
- Powerplant: 2 × Pratt & Whitney Canada PW207K turboshaft engines, 470 kW (630 shp) each
- Main rotor diameter: 11.5 m (37 ft 9 in)
- Main rotor area: 103.87 m^{2} (1,118.0 sq ft)

Performance

- Maximum speed: 275 km/h (171 mph, 148 kn)
- Cruise speed: 220 km/h (140 mph, 120 kn)
- Never exceed speed: 275 km/h (171 mph, 148 kn)
- Range: 505 km (314 mi, 273 nmi)
- Endurance: 3 hours 07 minutes
- Service ceiling: 5,500 m (18,000 ft) *Hover ceiling IGE: 5,463 ft (1,665 m)
- Hover ceiling OGE: 4,396 ft (1,340 m)
- Rate of climb: 14 m/s (2,800 ft/min)

== See also ==
Aircraft of comparable role, configuration, and era

- AgustaWestland AW109
- Bell 429 GlobalRanger
- Eurocopter EC145
- Kamov Ka-226
- MD Helicopters MD Explorer

== Bibliography ==
- Broadbent, Mark. "Rotary Focus: Ansat for emergency services". Air International, July 2020, Vol. 99, No. 1. p. 16. ISSN 0306-5634.
- Butowski, Piotr. "Russian Review: New designations for Ansat". Air International, July 2020, Vol. 99, No. 1. p. 30. ISSN 0306-5634.
- Jackson, Paul. Jane's All The World's Aircraft 2003–2004. Coulsdon, UK: Jane's Information Group, 2003. ISBN 0-7106-2537-5.
- Mladenov, Alexander. "Re-engined Ansat for Russia". Air International, November 2010, Vol 79 No 5. p. 26. ISSN 0306-5634.
- Mladenov, Alexander. "Ansat". Air International, February 2016, Vol 90, No. 2. pp. 78–82. ISSN 0306-5634
