= Alliant =

Alliant may refer to:

- Alliant Aviation, an American aircraft manufacturer based in Three Rivers, Michigan and later in Richland, Michigan
  - Alliant Destiny Fusion, an American powered parachute design
  - Alliant Destiny XLT, an American powered parachute design
- Alliant Computer Systems, an American computer company that designed and manufactured parallel computing systems
- Alliant Credit Union, a Chicago-based financial cooperative
- Alliant Energy, an American public utility holding company that incorporated in Madison, Wisconsin in 1981
- Alliant Energy Center, an American multi-building complex in Madison, Wisconsin
- Alliant Exchange, Inc, an American food service company
- Alliant International University an American private, higher education institution based in San Diego, California
- Alliant Techsystems, an American aerospace, defense, and sporting goods company based in Arlington County, Virginia
  - Alliant RQ-6 Outrider, an American unmanned aerial vehicle
