= ABS Aerolight Legacy =

French powered parachute

Legacy

General information
- Type: Powered parachute
- National origin: France
- Manufacturer: ABS Aerolight
- Status: Production completed

The ABS Aerolight Legacy is a French powered parachute that was designed and produced by ABS Aerolight of Sérignan-du-Comtat. Now out of production, when it was available the aircraft was supplied as a complete ready-to-fly-aircraft and as a kit for amateur construction.

The company appears to have gone out of business in late 2007 and production ended.

== Design and development ==
The Legacy was designed to comply with the Fédération Aéronautique Internationale microlight category, including the category's maximum gross weight of 450 kg (992 lb). The aircraft has a maximum gross weight of 400 kg (882 lb). It features a 46.50 m^{2} (500.5 sq ft) parachute-style wing, two-seats-in-side-by-side configuration in a semi-enclosed cockpit, tricycle landing gear and a single 105 hp (78 kW) Hirth F-30 four-cylinder, horizontally opposed, two-stroke, aircraft engine in pusher configuration.

The aircraft carriage is built from composites. In flight steering is accomplished via a steering wheel that actuates the canopy brakes, creating roll and yaw. The main landing gear incorporates suspension and a cockpit heater was a factory option.

The aircraft has an empty weight of 185 kg (408 lb) and a gross weight of 400 kg (882 lb), giving a useful load of 215 kg (474 lb). With full fuel of 38 litres (8.4 imp gal; 10 US gal) the payload is 188 kg (414 lb).

== Specifications (Legacy) ==
Data from Bertrand

General characteristics

- Crew: one
- Capacity: one passenger
- Wingspan: 11.76 m (38 ft 7 in)
- Wing area: 46.5 m^{2} (501 sq ft)
- Aspect ratio: 2.9:1
- Empty weight: 185 kg (408 lb)
- Gross weight: 400 kg (882 lb)
- Fuel capacity: 38 litres (8.4 imp gal; 10 US gal)
- Powerplant: 1 × Hirth F-30 four cylinder, two-stroke, air-cooled aircraft engine, 78 kW (105 hp)

Performance

- Maximum speed: 48 km/h (30 mph, 26 kn)
- Stall speed: 30 km/h (19 mph, 16 kn)
- Rate of climb: 4 m/s (790 ft/min)
- Wing loading: 8.6 kg/m^{2} (1.8 lb/sq ft)
