= Pietro Terzi Lucy THM =

2000s Italian experimental aircraft

Lucy THM
- Lucy THM, during ground tests, 2009

General information
- Type: Experimental aircraft
- National origin: Italy
- Manufacturer: Pietro Terzi
- Owners: Lucy THM srl
- Number built: 1

History
- Introduction date: 2009
- Retired: 2010

The Pietro Terzi Lucy THM was an experimental STOL proof of concept aircraft, designed and built by the Italian aeronautical engineer Pietro Terzi in the late 2000s.

== Design and development ==
The aircraft was designed to achieve extremely short takeoff and landings (ESTOL), and to fill the gap between the performances of conventional aircraft and that of helicopters.

The fuselage was of the pod and boom type, with the two occupants sitting within an extensively glazed, semi-enclosed cockpit. Rather than being seated, they were to sit astride a saddle, with their legs positioned within a pair of faired protrusions at the base of the cockpit. A tractor engine was located just underneath a boom extending from the top of the fuselage, which powered a 2-blade 3.2 m (10 ft) diameter propeller.

The cantilevered wing had an unusual M-wing planform, with the leading edge being swept forward to its mid-span point, then swept back from there to the wingtip. The wing's trailing edge proscribed an arc of circle profile. The wing did not incorporate slots, flaps, or ailerons. All of the control surfaces were contained within the aircraft's tail, with the tailplane having inboard elevators and outboard elevons. There was a fixed tricycle undercarriage, which was ground adjustable to allow the wing's angle of attack during takeoff to be anywhere between 18° and 25°. Terzi anticipated take-off runs of 15 m (49 ft) or less. Much of the aircraft was constructed using composites and moulds, with the control surfaces being made from aluminium.

== Operational History ==
Construction began in 2007, and was completed by February 2009. During March and April 2009, the aircraft was displayed at the Triennale di Milano design museum in Milan, as part of its Serie Fuori Serie exhibition. Ground testing commenced in July 2009 and ended in December 2009. Flight tests were to commence in January 2010, however in July, it was announced that "tests had been completed", without stating that it had flown.

== Specifications ==
Data from Lucy THM

General characteristics

- Crew: 1
- Capacity: 1
- Wingspan: 4.8 m (15 ft 9 in)
- Airfoil: modified Eppler
- Gross weight: 400 kg (882 lb)
- Powerplant: 1 × Hirth 3701 , 63 kW (84 hp)
- Propellers: 2-bladed, 3.2 m (10 ft 6 in) diameter

Performance

- Maximum speed: 480 km/h (300 mph, 260 kn)
- Stall speed: 105 km/h (65 mph, 56 kn)
- Rate of climb: 18 m/s (3,500 ft/min)

== See also ==
Aircraft of comparable role, configuration, and era

- Lewis Ascender
- Wild DoubleEnder
