= ABS Aerolight =

French aircraft manufacturer

- Company type: Privately held company
- Industry: Aerospace
- Defunct: circa 2007
- Headquarters: Sérignan-du-Comtat, France
- Products: Powered parachutes, roadable aircraft

ABS Aerolight was a French aircraft manufacturer based in Sérignan-du-Comtat. The company specialized in the design and manufacture of powered parachutes and roadable aircraft, in the form of kits for amateur construction and ready-to-fly aircraft for the European Fédération Aéronautique Internationale microlight category.

The company appears to have gone out of business in late 2007 and production ended.

The company produced a line of powered parachutes in the mid-2000s, including the semi-enclosed cockpit ABS Aerolight Legacy and two models of roadable aircraft, the ABS Aerolight ATE and the development ABS Aerolight Navigathor. The ATE and Navigathor both feature a wedge-shaped boat hull, a parachute wing and off-road four-wheeled landing gear for land use and are powered by a ducted fan in all modes.

== Aircraft ==
Summary of aircraft built by ABS Aerolight
| Model name | First flight | Number built | Type |
|---|---|---|---|
| ABS Aerolight ATE | | | Powered parachute/boat/roadable aircraft |
| ABS Aerolight Legacy | | | Semi-enclosed cockpit powered parachute |
| ABS Aerolight Navigathor | | | Powered parachute/boat/roadable aircraft |
