= ABS Aerolight Navigathor =

Navigathor

General information
- Type: Powered parachute and roadable aircraft
- National origin: France
- Manufacturer: ABS Aerolight
- Status: Production completed

The ABS Aerolight Navigathor is a French powered parachute and roadable aircraft that was designed and produced by ABS Aerolight of Sérignan-du-Comtat. Now out of production, when it was available the aircraft was supplied as a complete ready-to-fly-aircraft and as a kit for amateur construction.

The company appears to have gone out of business in late 2007 and production ended.

== Design and development ==
The Navigathor is a development of the earlier ATE, which stands for Air-Terre-Eau (English: Air-Land-Water) and indicates that the vehicle is capable of being used as a flying car with a top road speed of 150 km/h (93 mph) or as a boat with a top water speed of 7 km/h (4 mph).

As an aircraft the Navigathor was designed to comply with the Fédération Aéronautique Internationale microlight category, including the category's maximum gross weight of 450 kg (992 lb). The aircraft has a maximum gross weight of 450 kg (992 lb). The aircraft carriage is built from a combination of metal tubing and composites and features a wedge-shaped boat hull. It features a 46 m^{2} (500 sq ft) parachute-style wing, two-seats-in-tandem in an open cockpit, four-wheeled cross country all terrain vehicle style landing gear and a single 105 hp (78 kW) Hirth F-30 four-cylinder, horizontally opposed, two-stroke, aircraft engine, mounted in pusher configuration. In all modes the vehicle is powered by its ducted propeller.

The vehicle has an empty weight of 230 kg (507 lb) and a gross weight of 450 kg (992 lb), giving a useful load of 220 kg (485 lb). With full fuel of 35 litres (7.7 imp gal; 9.2 US gal) the payload is 195 kg (430 lb).

== Variants ==
ATE
Initial model flying car/boat, Air-Terre-Eau (English: Air-Land-Water).
Navigathor
Improved model flying car/boat.

== Specifications (Navigathor) ==
Data from Bertrand

General characteristics

- Crew: one
- Capacity: one passenger
- Wingspan: 11 m (36 ft 1 in)
- Wing area: 46 m^{2} (500 sq ft)
- Aspect ratio: 2.7:1
- Empty weight: 230 kg (507 lb)
- Gross weight: 450 kg (992 lb)
- Fuel capacity: 35 litres (7.7 imp gal; 9.2 US gal)
- Powerplant: 1 × Hirth F-30 four cylinder, two-stroke, air-cooled aircraft engine, 78 kW (105 hp)

Performance

- Rate of climb: 3 m/s (590 ft/min)
- Wing loading: 9.7 kg/m^{2} (2.0 lb/sq ft)
