= 2706 =

2706 may refer to:

- 2706 Borovský asteroid
- Hirth 2706 two stroke aircraft engine
- The year in the 28th century
