= Airfer Transan =

Spanish powered parachute

Transan

General information
- Type: Powered parachute
- National origin: Spain
- Manufacturer: Airfer Paramotores

The Aifer Transan is a Spanish powered parachute, designed and produced by Airfer Paramotores.

== Design and development ==
The aircraft was designed to comply with the Fédération Aéronautique Internationale microlight rules. It features a parachute-style high-wing and two seats in tandem in an open framed structure, tricycle landing gear and a single 52 hp (39 kW) Hirth engine in pusher configuration. The Transan was also available powered by a Rotax 503, Hirth 2702 and 2703 engines.

== Variants ==
Airfer Trike Monoplaza
Single-seat light-weight variant.
Airfer Trike Biplaza
Tandem two-seater
Airfer Tranan
Tandem two-seater
Airfer Transam 2702
Tandem two-seater with a Hirth 2702 engine.

== Specifications (Transan) ==
Data from World Directory of Leisure Aviation 2004/2005

General characteristics

- Crew: two
- Empty weight: 340 lb (154 kg)
- Powerplant: 1 × Hirth aircraft engine, 52 hp (39 kW)
- Propellers: 4-bladed
