= Hirth 3701 =

German two-stroke aircraft engine

- Type: Three-cylinder two-stroke aircraft engine
- National origin: Germany
- Manufacturer: Hirth

The Hirth 3701 is an in-line three-cylinder, two-stroke, carburetted aircraft engine, with optional fuel injection, designed for use on ultralight aircraft and small homebuilts. It is manufactured by Hirth of Germany.

== Development ==
The 3701 was developed as a liquid-cooled and narrower installation alternative to the four-cylinder Hirth F-30 air-cooled engine of 85 to 110 hp (63 to 82 kW).

The 3701 features triple Bing 34 mm slide carburetors or optionally fuel injection. The cylinder walls are electrochemically coated with Nikasil. Standard starting is electric start and recoil start is not available as an option. The reduction drive system available is the G-50 gearbox, with reduction ratios of 2.16:1, 2.29:1, 2.59:1, 3.16:1, or 3.65:1.

The engine runs on a 50:1 pre-mix of unleaded 93 octane auto fuel and oil, or optionally 100:1 oil injection.

== Variants ==
3701 high-torque/low-rpm engine
Three-cylinder in-line, two-stroke aircraft engine with three Bing 34 mm slide carburetors or fuel injection. Low piston port timing produces 84 hp (63 kW) at 4950 rpm with a very flat torque curve.
3701 high-performance engine
Three-cylinder in-line, two stroke aircraft engine with three Bing 34 mm slide carburetors or fuel injection. High piston port timing produces 100 hp (75 kW) at 6000 rpm with a steep torque curve.

== Applications ==
- Alliant Destiny Fusion
- Alliant Destiny XLT
- CGS Hawk II Arrow
- Eagle Helicycle
- Earthstar Thunder Gull II
- Quicksilver MX II
- Pietro Terzi Lucy THM
- InterPlane Skyboy
- Rans S-9 Chaos
- Zenair CH 601 Zodiac

== Specifications (3701 high performance) ==
Data from Recreational Power Engineering

=== General characteristics ===
- Type: Three-cylinder, two-stroke, in-line, aircraft engine
- Bore: 76 mm (3.0 in)
- Stroke: 69 mm (2.7 in)
- Displacement: 939 cc (57.3 cu in)
- Length: 490 mm (19.3 in)
- Width: 280 mm (11.0 in)
- Height: 420 mm (16.5 in)
- Dry weight: 108 lb (49.0 kg), including electric starter and exhaust system. With optional gearbox total weight is 127 lb (57.6 kg), plus radiator.

=== Components ===
- Valvetrain: piston ported
- Fuel system: 3 X Bing 34 mm slide type carburetors or fuel injection
- Fuel type: unleaded 93 octane auto fuel
- Oil system: 50:1 fuel/oil premix or oil injection
- Cooling system: liquid
- Reduction gear: G-50 gearbox with reduction ratios of 2.16:1, 2.29:1, 2.59:1, 3.16:1, or 3.65:1

=== Performance ===
- Power output: 100 hp (75 kW) at 6000 rpm
- Compression ratio: 9.5:1

== See also ==
- Arrow 1000
