= Arrow 1000 =

- Type: Two-stroke aircraft engine
- National origin: Italy
- Manufacturer: Arrow SNC

The Arrow 1000 is a four-cylinder, horizontally opposed, two-stroke, single- or dual-ignition, aircraft engine that was designed for float-equipped ultralight aircraft by Arrow SNC of Italy.

The Arrow family of engines are modular in design and share the same pistons, cylinders and gearboxes assembled around different crankcase designs, giving one-, two- or four-cylinder engines. Arrow engines are no longer in production.

== Development ==
The 1000 is a conventional four-cylinder engine that weighs 145 lb (66 kg). The engine features single or optional dual ignition, reed valve induction, free air cooling, tuned exhaust system, slide venturi-type Bing carburetors, fuel pump, Nikasil cylinder coatings. The engine was offered with a gearbox reduction system that included a one-way clutch. Starting is electric starter with no provision for a recoil starter.

The 1000 produces 100 hp (75 kW), runs on premium unleaded auto fuel and has a recommended time between overhaul of 300 hours.

The tuned exhaust supplied with the engine has been criticized as "cumbersome" and needing modification to fit most aircraft.

== Specifications (Arrow 1000) ==
Data from Cliche

=== General characteristics ===
- Type: Four-cylinder, horizontally opposed two-stroke aircraft engine
- Displacement: 1000 cc (61.02 cu in)
- Dry weight: 145 lb (66 kg)

=== Components ===
- Valvetrain: reed valve
- Oil system: premixed oil and fuel
- Cooling system: air-cooled
- Reduction gear: gearbox

=== Performance ===
- Power output: 100 hp (75 kW)

== See also ==
- List of aircraft engines
- Hirth 3701
- Hirth F-30
- Rotax 912S
