= 2704 =

2704 may refer to:

- 2704 Julian Loewe asteroid
- Hirth 2704 two stroke aircraft engine
- The year in the 28th century
