= Arrow 500 =

- Type: Two-stroke aircraft engine
- National origin: Italy
- Manufacturer: Arrow SNC

The Arrow 500 is a twin-cylinder, horizontally opposed, two-stroke, single or dual ignition, aircraft engine that was designed for ultralight aircraft by Arrow SNC of Italy.

The Arrow family of engines are modular in design and share the same pistons, cylinders and gearboxes assembled around different crankcase designs, giving one-, two- or four-cylinder engines. Arrow engines are no longer in production.

== Development ==
The 500 is a conventional twin-cylinder engine that weighs 88 lb (40 kg). The engine features single or optional dual ignition, reed valve induction, free air cooling, tuned exhaust system, a single slide venturi-type Bing carburetor, fuel pump, Nikasil cylinder coatings. The engine was offered with a gearbox reduction system that included a one way clutch. Starting is electric starter with no provision for a recoil starter.

The 500 produces 65 hp (48 kW), runs on premium unleaded auto fuel and has a recommended time between overhaul of 400 hours.

The tuned exhaust supplied with the engine has been criticized as "cumbersome" and needing modification to fit most aircraft.

== Specifications (Arrow 500) ==
Data from Cliche

=== General characteristics ===
- Type: Twin-cylinder, horizontally opposed two-stroke aircraft engine
- Displacement: 500 cc (30.51 cu in)
- Dry weight: 88 lb (40 kg)

=== Components ===
- Valvetrain: reed valve
- Oil system: premixed oil and fuel
- Cooling system: air-cooled
- Reduction gear: gearbox

=== Performance ===
- Power output: 65 hp (48 kW)

== See also ==
- List of aircraft engines
- Hirth 2706
- Hirth 3202
- Rotax 532
- Rotax 582
