= Airfer =

Spanish aircraft manufacturer

Airfer Paramotores
- Company type: Privately held company
- Industry: Aerospace
- Headquarters: Socuéllamos, Spain
- Products: Paramotors
- Website: www.airfer.com

Airfer Paramotores (formally Paramotores Air-Future, S.L.) is a Spanish aircraft manufacturer once based in Pontevedra and more recently in Socuéllamos in the Province of Ciudad Real. The company specializes in the design and manufacture of paramotors and powered parachutes in the form of ready-to-fly aircraft for the US FAR 103 Ultralight Vehicles rules and the European Fédération Aéronautique Internationale microlight category.

Airfer has produced a line of paramotors that make use of titanium frames to save weight in increase durability. Older models no longer in production include the Airfer Bimax, Titan and Tornado. The current production paramotor is the Airfer Explorer series.

The company also produces powered parachutes, including the now out-of-production Airfer Transan. Current powered parachute designs include the Trike C1, Trike C1 Sport, Rumbo 250, Diamond Thor 250, Yumbo and the Mustang.

== Aircraft ==
Summary of aircraft built by Airfer
Model name	First flight	Number built	Type
Airfer Bimax	2000s		Paramotor
Airfer Titan	2000s		Paramotor
Airfer Tornado	2000s		Paramotor
Airfer Transan	2000s		Powered parachute
Airfer Trike C1	2010s		Powered parachute
Airfer Trike C1 Sport	2010s		Powered parachute
Airfer Rumbo 250	2010s		Powered parachute
Airfer Yumbo	2010s		Powered parachute
Airfer Diamond Thor 250	2010s		Powered parachute
Airfer Mustang	2010s		Powered parachute
