= 2702 =

2702 may refer to:

- 2702 Batrakov asteroid
- Hirth 2702 two stroke aircraft engine
- Detachment 2702 - a fictional military unit from the book Cryptonomicon
- The year in the 28th century
