= Hirth F-30 =

German two-stroke aircraft engine

- Type: Four-cylinder two-stroke aircraft engine
- National origin: Germany
- Manufacturer: Hirth

The Hirth F-30 is a horizontally opposed four-cylinder, two-stroke, carburetted aircraft engine, with optional fuel injection, designed for use on ultralight aircraft and homebuilts. It is manufactured by Hirth of Germany.

== Development ==
The F-30 is equipped with a dual capacitor discharge ignition system and is free-air-cooled, with optional fan cooling. The cylinder walls are electrochemically coated with Nikasil. Standard starting is electric start and recoil start is not an option. The reduction drive system available is the G-40 gearbox with optional reduction ratios of 2.03:1, 2.25:1, 2.64:1, 2.96:1 and 3.33:1. A centrifugal clutch is also available as optional equipment.

The engine runs on a 50:1 pre-mix of unleaded 93 octane auto fuel and oil.

== Variants ==
F-30
Four-cylinder horizontally opposed, two-stroke, aircraft engine with a dual 38 mm diaphragm carburetors. Produces 85 hp (63 kW) at 5,500 rpm if free-air-cooled or 80 hp (60 kW) at 5,500 rpm if fan cooled. It has a factory rated time between overhaul (TBO) of 1,200 hours. Not in production.
F-30E
Four-cylinder horizontally opposed, two-stroke, aircraft engine with fuel injection. Produces 90 hp (67 kW) at 5,500 rpm if free-air-cooled or 85 hp (63 kW) at 5,500 rpm if fan cooled. It has a factory rated TBO of 1,200 hours. Not in production.
F-30S
Four-cylinder horizontally opposed, two-stroke, aircraft engine with dual integral pumper carburetors. Produces 100 hp (75 kW) at 6200 rpm if free-air-cooled or 95 hp (71 kW) at 6,200 rpm if fan-cooled. It has a factory rated TBO of 1,000 hours. Not in production.
F-30ES
Four-cylinder horizontally opposed, two-stroke, aircraft engine with fuel injection. Produces 110 hp (82 kW) at 6,200 rpm if free-air-cooled or 105 hp (78 kW) at 6,200 rpm if fan-cooled. It has a factory rated TBO of 1,000 hours. Not in production.

== Applications ==
- ABS Aerolight Legacy
- ABS Aerolight Navigathor
- Acrolite
- Aeros UL-2000 Flamingo
- Airdrome Fokker D-VII
- Airdrome Nieuport 24
- American Sportscopter Ultrasport 496
- Aviastroitel AC-7M
- Denney Kitfox
- DF Helicopters DF334
- Falconar F11 Sporty
- Howland H-2 Honey Bee
- Kolb Mark III
- Lockheed Martin P-791
- Paladin Hercules
- Para-Ski Top Gun
- Peak Aerospace Me 109R
- Rans S-12
- Solid Air Diamant Twin
- Swing-Europe Parashell
- Titan Tornado

== Specifications (F-30ES) ==
Data from Recreational Power Engineering

=== General characteristics ===
- Type: Four-cylinder, two-stroke, horizontally opposed, aircraft engine
- Bore: 72 mm (2.8 in)
- Stroke: 64 mm (2.5 in)
- Displacement: 1,042 cc (63.6 cu in)
- Length: 380 mm (15.0 in)
- Width: 660 mm (26.0 in)
- Height: 355 mm (14.0 in)
- Dry weight: 105 lb (47.6 kg), including starter and exhaust system, 129 lb (58.5 kg) with gearbox, exhaust system and electric start. Fan cooling adds 8.5 lb (3.9 kg)

=== Components ===
- Fuel system: Fuel injection
- Fuel type: unleaded 93 octane auto fuel
- Oil system: 50:1 fuel-oil premix or oil injection
- Cooling system: free-air or fan
- Reduction gear: G-40 gearbox with reduction ratios of 2.03:1, 2.25:1, 2.64:1, 2.96:1 and 3.33:1 available. Optional centrifugal clutch.

=== Performance ===
- Power output: 110 hp (82 kW) at 6,200 rpm with free-air cooling, 105 hp (78 kW) at 6,200 rpm with fan cooling
- Compression ratio: 9.5:1

== See also ==
- 2si 808
- Arrow 1000
- Rotax 912
