= Howland H-2 Honey Bee =

American homebuilt airplane

H-2 Honey Bee

General information
- Type: Homebuilt aircraft
- National origin: United States
- Manufacturer: Howland Aero Design
- Designer: Bert Howland
- Status: Plans may still be available, kits still available
- Number built: 9 (2003)

History
- First flight: 1986
- Variant: Howland H-3 Pegasus

The Howland H-2 Honey Bee is an American homebuilt aircraft that was designed by Bert Howland and made available by Howland Aero Design in the form of plans for amateur construction, with kits provided by Aircraft Spruce & Specialty Co. The H-2 first flew in 1986.

== Design and development ==
The H-2 is a single-seat, open cockpit biplane, with conventional landing gear and a single engine in tractor configuration.

The aircraft is made from aluminium and covered in doped aircraft fabric covering. The fuselage is made from square aluminum tubing that is TIG welded and weighs 24 lb (11 kg) when completed. Its 19 ft (5.8 m) span wings are of a straight planform and both of equal span. The wings have seven foam wing ribs per wing panel and incorporate a D-cell front spar and a C-channel rear spar. The landing gear is conventional, with suspended main wheels and a steerable tailwheel. The H-2 has an open cockpit, with a small windshield. Controls are conventional three-axis, with ailerons, rudder and elevator. The standard design has two ailerons, with four optional.

Since the death of the designer plans have been intermittently available and were last provided by Classic Aero Enterprises. Aircraft Spruce and Specialty continue to provide raw materials kits.

The aircraft has an acceptable power range of 40 to 95 hp (30 to 71 kW) and the Hirth 2706 of 65 hp (48 kW) is the standard engine recommended. Installation of the 95 hp (71 kW) Hirth F30, or an equivalent engine, along with an inverted fuel system, allows intermediate level competition aerobatics.

The plans consist of 40 engineering drawings and a booklet of construction notes. Estimated building time is 800 hours.

== Variants ==
H-2
Base model with two ailerons and a 65 hp (48 kW) Hirth 2706 engine
H-2A
Aerobatic competition model with four ailerons, inverted fuel system and a 95 hp (71 kW) Hirth F30 engine

== Specifications (H-2) ==
Data from Kitplanes and Purdy

General characteristics

- Crew: one
- Length: 15.8 ft (4.8 m)
- Upper wingspan: 19 ft (5.8 m)
- Lower wingspan: 19 ft (5.8 m)
- Height: 6.1 ft (1.9 m)
- Wing area: 140 sq ft (13 m^{2})
- Empty weight: 495 lb (225 kg)
- Gross weight: 700 lb (318 kg)
- Fuel capacity: 12 U.S. gallons (45 L; 10.0 imp gal)
- Powerplant: 1 × Hirth 2706 Twin cylinder, two-stroke aircraft engine, 65 hp (48 kW)
- Propellers: 2-bladed wooden

Performance

- Maximum speed: 80 mph (130 km/h, 70 kn)
- Cruise speed: 68 mph (109 km/h, 59 kn)
- Stall speed: 35 mph (56 km/h, 30 kn)
- Range: 120 mi (190 km, 100 nmi)
- Service ceiling: 9,000 ft (2,700 m)
- g limits: +8/-6
- Rate of climb: 850 ft/min (4.3 m/s)
- Wing loading: 5.0 lb/sq ft (24 kg/m^{2})

== See also ==
Aircraft of comparable role, configuration, and era

- Davis DA-2 low-wing V tail two seater
