= Arrow SNC =

Italian aircraft engine manufacturer

- Company type: Privately held company
- Industry: Aerospace
- Founded: Before 1998
- Defunct: After 2001
- Fate: Out of business
- Headquarters: Piacenza, Italy
- Products: Aircraft engines

Arrow SNC was an Italian aircraft engine manufacturer based in Piacenza. The company specialized in the design and manufacture of two-stroke engines for ultralight and homebuilt aircraft. The company is no longer in business.

The company developed a series of engines that were of a modular design, with the same pistons, cylinders and gearboxes, but using different crankcases. These were assembled into single, twin and four-cylinder engines named for their displacements in cubic centimetres. The single cylinder Arrow 250 has a displacement of 250 cc (15 cu in) and puts out 25 kW (34 hp). From the 250 was developed the Arrow 270 AC, which has a displacement of 250 cc (15 cu in) and puts out 26 kW (35 hp). The twin cylinder Arrow 500 has a displacement of 500 cc (31 cu in) and puts out 48 kW (64 hp), while the four-cylinder Arrow 1000 has a displacement of 1,000 cc (61 cu in) and puts out 75 kW (101 hp).

At one time the company did have a North American distributor in Montreal, Quebec, Canada.

== Engines ==
Summary of engines built by Arrow SNC
Model name	Power	Type
Arrow 250	25 kW (34 hp)	Single cylinder, two stroke aircraft engine
Arrow 270 AC	26 kW (35 hp)	Single cylinder, two stroke aircraft engine
Arrow 500	48 kW (64 hp)	Twin cylinder, two stroke aircraft engine
Arrow 1000	75 kW (101 hp)	Four-cylinder, two stroke aircraft engine
