= LO 120 S =

German two-seat motor glider

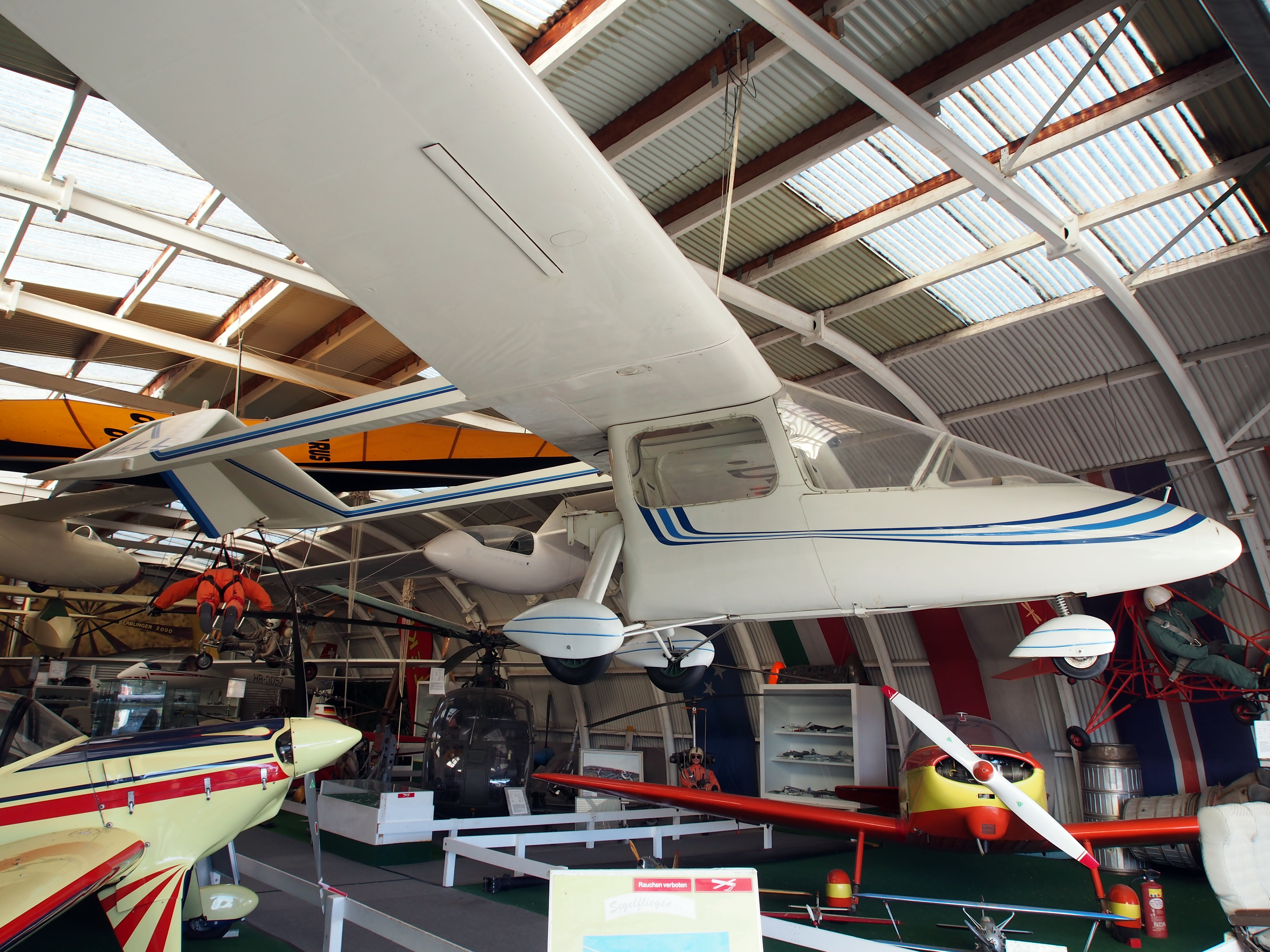

General information
- Type: Motor glider
- National origin: Germany
- Manufacturer: LO-Fluggerätebau
- Status: Production completed

History
- Variant: LTD LO-120S

The LO 120 S is a German parasol-wing, pusher configuration, open-cockpit, two-seats in tandem motor glider that was designed and produced by LO-Fluggerätebau. When it was available it was supplied as a kit for amateur construction and meets European microlight rules.

== Design and development ==
The LO 120 S is of unusual design. The fuselage resembles that of an ultralight trike, but instead of a hang glider flexible wing, it mounts a rigid, straight wing with a span of 14.94 m (49 ft) in the motor glider role, with optional shorter wings for powered cross country flying. Unlike conventional trikes, the aircraft has a tail, of twin-boom configuration with an inverted v-tail. Later models enclosed and faired the cockpit into the wing, making it a high-wing aircraft.

The LO 120 S is of mixed construction, using plywood, metal and composite materials. The specified engine is the Hirth 2704 of 30 kW (40 hp) mounted behind the cockpit as a pusher powerplant. The landing gear is tricycle gear.

== Specifications (LO 120 S) ==
Data from Purdy

General characteristics

- Crew: one
- Capacity: one passenger
- Wingspan: 14.94 m (49.00 ft)
- Empty weight: 200 kg (441 lb)
- Gross weight: 400 kg (882 lb)
- Powerplant: 1 × Hirth 2704 , 30 kW (40 hp)
- Propellers: 3-bladed wooden

Performance

- Maximum speed: 150 km/h (93 mph, 81 kn)
- Cruise speed: 119 km/h (74 mph, 64 kn)
- Range: 600 km (373 mi, 324 nmi)
- Rate of climb: 3.5 m/s (680 ft/min)

== See also ==
- List of gliders
