= Alliant Destiny XLT =

Destiny XLT

General information
- Type: Powered parachute
- National origin: United States
- Manufacturer: Alliant Aviation

The Alliant Destiny XLT is an American two-seat powered parachute, designed and produced by Alliant Aviation based at Richland, Michigan.

== Design and development ==
The aircraft was designed to comply with the FAI Microlight rules. It features a parachute-style high-wing and two-seats in tandem in an open frame, tricycle landing gear and a single 64 hp (48 kW) Rotax 582 engine in pusher configuration. Versions were also available with a Rotax 503 or Hirth 3701 engine.

== Variants ==
ST
Single-seat variant
LT
Two-seat lightweight variant
XLT
Heavier two-seat variant

== Specifications (XLT with Rotax 582) ==
Data from World Directory of Leisure Aviation 2004/2005

General characteristics

- Crew: two
- Empty weight: 386 lb (175 kg)
- Gross weight: 992 lb (450 kg)
- Powerplant: 1 × Rotax 582 twin cylinder, two-stroke, liquid-cooled aircraft engine, 64 hp (48 kW)
- Propellers: 3-bladed

Performance

- Maximum speed: 34 mph (55 km/h, 30 kn)
- Cruise speed: 32 mph (52 km/h, 28 kn)
