= Hirth F-263 =

German two-stroke aircraft engine

- Type: Twin cylinder two-stroke aircraft engine
- National origin: Germany
- Manufacturer: Hirth

The Hirth F-263 is a twin-cylinder, in-line, two-stroke, carburetted aircraft engine that was designed for use on ultralight aircraft. It was manufactured by Hirth of Germany, but was discontinued about 2001.

== Development ==
The F-263 uses fan cooling and piston-ported induction, with a single Bing carburetor and single capacitor discharge ignition. The cylinder walls are electrochemically coated with Nikasil. Standard starting is recoil start. A gearbox reduction drive system and electric start were factory options.

The engine produces 31 hp (23 kW) and runs on a 50:1 pre-mix of unleaded 93 octane auto fuel and oil. Recommended time between overhauls is 1000 hours.

== Applications ==
- Howland H-3 Pegasus
- Falconar HM-293

== Specifications (F-263) ==
Data from Cliche

=== General characteristics ===
- Type: Twin-cylinder, two-stroke, aircraft engine
- Displacement: 383 cc (23.4 cu in)
- Dry weight: 70 lb (31.8 kg)

=== Components ===
- Valvetrain: piston-ported
- Fuel system: 1 X Bing carburetor
- Fuel type: unleaded 93 octane auto fuel
- Oil system: 50:1 fuel/oil premix
- Cooling system: fan forced air
- Reduction gear: optional gearbox

=== Performance ===
- Power output: 30 hp (22 kW)

== See also ==
- Arrow 250
- Kawasaki 440
