= RemSchetMash Robust =

RSM-15 Robust
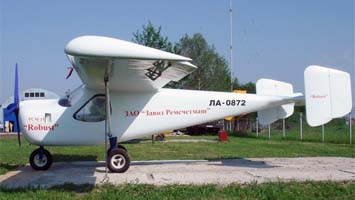

General information
- Type: Ultralight
- National origin: Ukraine
- Manufacturer: RemSchetMash jsc, Druzhkivka
- Number built: 1?

History
- First flight: 2006

The RemSchetMash RSM-15 Robust is a single-seat, single-engine ultralight built in Ukraine. It first flew in 2006 but no production aircraft had been produced by late 2009.

== Design and development ==
The RemSchetMash Robust is the only aircraft built to date by this general manufacturing company. It has a high wing of constant chord, without flaps. The wings are braced by single struts to the lower fuselage. This is a carbon fibre monocoque with a starboard side door for access to the single-seat cockpit. A conventional tricycle undercarriage is mounted on the fuselage with spring steel cantilever legs bearing the mainwheels. The rear underside of the fuselage tapers upwards to the tail, where a constant chord tailplane carries a single piece elevator between two endplate fins. The fins and rudders are parallel edged but with rounded tips, the rudders noticeably less deep than the fins.

The Robust is powered by a German 41 kW (55 hp) Hirth 2703 twin-cylinder in-line two-stroke engine, driving a three-blade propeller via reduction gearing.

The prototype Robust, serial LA-0872, first flew in 2006. As with some other Ukrainian ultralights, e.g. the Lilienthal Bekas, agricultural spraying was seen as a possible role, but no further aircraft appear to have been built. An enlarged version, the RSM-25 Bekas, has been considered. This would have a span increased to 11.40 m (37 ft 5 in), a maximum take-off weight of 495 kg (1,091 lb) and be powered by a 60 kW (80 hp) Volkswagen 2300 engine.

== Specifications ==
Data from Jane's All the World's Aircraft 2010/11

General characteristics

- Capacity: 1
- Length: 5.47 m (17 ft 11 in)
- Wingspan: 8.94 m (29 ft 4 in)
- Height: 1.72 m (5 ft 8 in)
- Wing area: 10.60 m^{2} (114.1 sq ft) gross
- Airfoil: TsAGI R-III 16%
- Max takeoff weight: 340 kg (750 lb)
- Powerplant: 1 × Hirth 2703 2-cylinder in-line air-cooled two-stroke with 1:2.59 reduction gear, 41 kW (55 hp)
- Propellers: 3-bladed, 1.645 m (5 ft 5 in) diameter

Performance

- Maximum speed: 200 km/h (120 mph, 110 kn) at sea level
- Cruise speed: 180 km/h (110 mph, 97 kn)
- Stall speed: 65 km/h (40 mph, 35 kn)
- Never exceed speed: 250 km/h (160 mph, 130 kn)
- Range: 1,000 km (620 mi, 540 nmi) with 7% reserves
- g limits: +6/-3
- Rate of climb: 7.0 m/s (1,380 ft/min) at sea level
