= Kamov Ka-137 =

Type of aircraft

Ka-137
- An illustration of the KA-137

General information
- Type: Unmanned aerial vehicle
- Manufacturer: Kamov

History
- First flight: 1998

The Kamov Ka-137, previously designated MBVK-137, is an unmanned multipurpose helicopter designed for many roles, including reconnaissance, patrol, police and ecology, emergency, and data transmitting. Three versions of the Ka-137 were made — one ship-based, one automobile-based, and another carried by the Ka-32 helicopter. The aircraft uses a piston engine, driving a coaxial-rotor system and features a tailless, sphere-shaped fuselage with four-leg leaf-spring landing gear. Sensors and other equipment are located in a special equipment compartment.

== Specifications ==
General characteristics

- Crew: 1 ground operator
- Capacity: 80 kg (176 lb) internal cargo
- Diameter: 1.30 m (4 ft 3 in)
- Height: 2.30 m (7 ft 7 in)
- Gross weight: 280 kg (620 lb)
- Powerplant: 1 × Hirth 2706-R05 , 50 kW (65 hp)
- Main rotor diameter: 5.30 m (17 ft 5 in)
- Main rotor area: 8.3 m^{2} (90 sq ft)

Performance

- Maximum speed: 175 km/h (110 mph, 96 kn)
- Range: 530 km (330 mi, 290 nmi)
- Endurance: 4 hours
- Service ceiling: 5,000 m (16,400 ft)

== See also ==
- VRT 300
