= Harmas de Fabre =

Garden in Vaucluse, France

Coordinates: 44°11′15″N 4°50′26″E

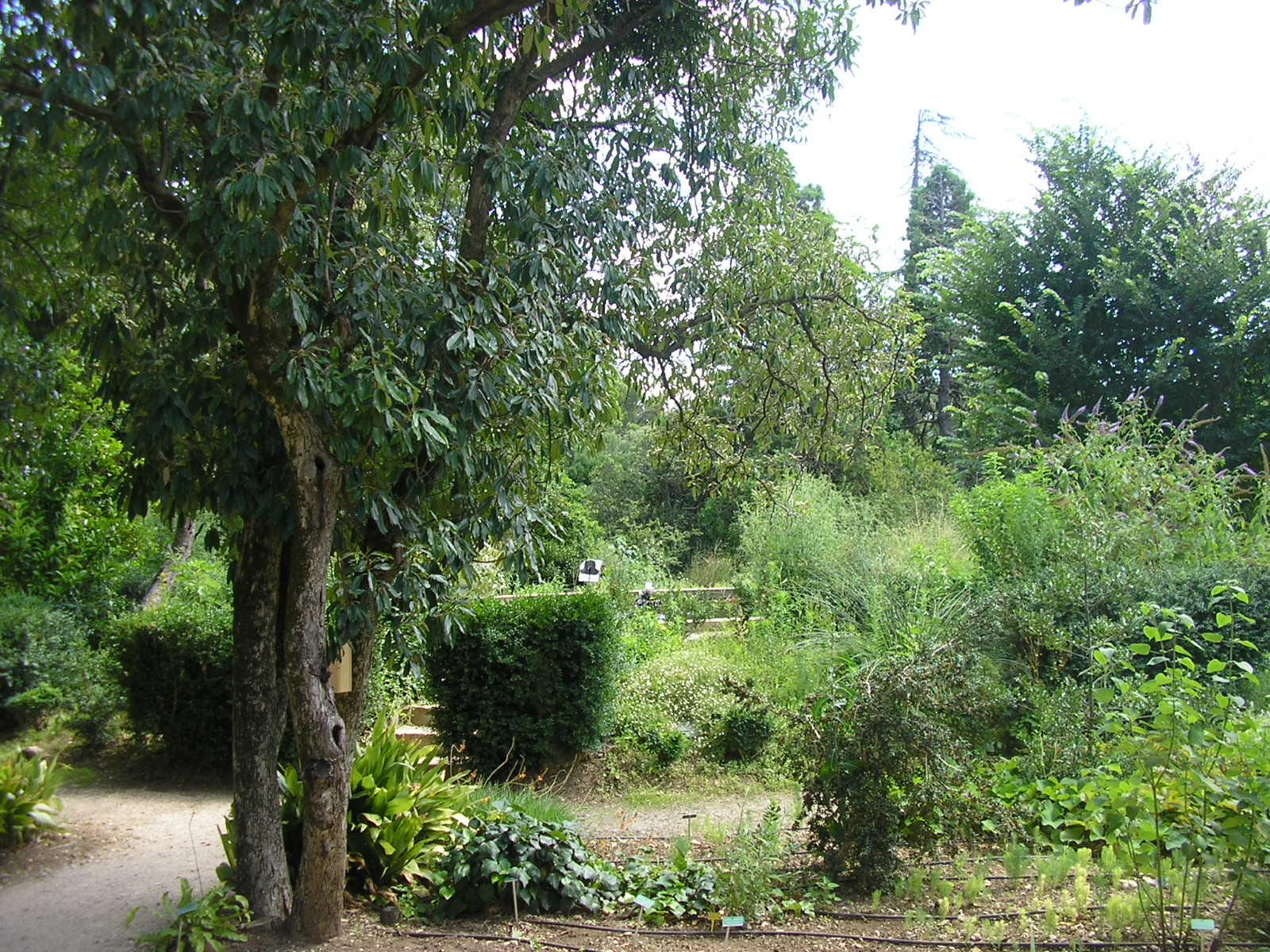
Harmas de Fabre

The Harmas de Fabre, also known as the Musée Harmas Jean-Henri Fabre, is a museum, botanical garden, and herbarium located on the Route d'Orange, Sérignan-du-Comtat, Vaucluse, Provence-Alpes-Côte d'Azur, France. It is open daily except Wednesday in the warmer months; an admission fee is charged.

The museum contains the house and the garden of naturalist and entomologist Jean Henri Fabre (1823-1915) who moved into this house in 1879, after which he devoted the rest of his life to the study of insects and flora. The word harmas means "fallow ground" in Provençal. In 1922 the Muséum National d'Histoire Naturelle acquired the site, and in 1955 nearly 700 watercolors, hand painted by Fabre, were found in attics of Harmas by his grandson. In 1998 the site was classified as a monument historique; restored by the Ministry of Culture and Communication, it opened to the public in 2006.

Today the museum contains Fabre's collections of fossils, minerals, 594 watercolors of mushrooms, manuscripts, a private herbarium of more than 20,000 specimens including plants harvested by Fabre during his stay in Corsica (1849-1852), and the small table on which his manuscripts were written, most notably the Souvenirs Entomologiques. The gardens contain 20 historic trees and over 500 plant species, as well as trails and a pool, and a small cold greenhouse built in 1880.

== See also ==
- List of botanical gardens in France
