= Arrow 250 =

Family of aircraft engines

- Type: Two-stroke aircraft engine
- National origin: Italy
- Manufacturer: Arrow SNC

The Arrow 250 is a family of single-cylinder, two-stroke, single- or dual-ignition aircraft engines that were designed for ultralight aircraft by Arrow SNC of Italy.

The Arrow family of engines are modular in design and share the same pistons, cylinders and gearboxes assembled around different crankcase designs, giving one-, two- or four-cylinder engines. Arrow engines are no longer in production.

== Development ==
The 250 is a conventional single-cylinder engine that weighs only 13 lb (6 kg). The engine features single- or optional dual-ignition, reed valve induction, free air cooling, tuned exhaust system, a slide venturi-type Bing carburetor, fuel pump, Nikasil cylinder coatings. The engine was offered with a gearbox reduction system that included a one-way clutch. Starting is electric starter with no provision for a recoil starter.

The tuned exhaust supplied with the engine has been criticized as "cumbersome" and needing modification to fit most aircraft.

== Variants ==
250
Gasoline aircraft engine, 34 hp (25 kW). Out of production.
270 AC
Gasoline aircraft engine, 35 hp (26 kW) at 6800 rpm, weight 13.2 lb (6.0 kg) with carburetor, alternator, fuel pump and starter. Out of production.

== Specifications (Arrow 250) ==
Data from Cliche

=== General characteristics ===
- Type: Single-cylinder, two-stroke aircraft engine
- Displacement: 250 cc (15.26 cu in)
- Dry weight: 13.2 lb (6 kg)

=== Components ===
- Valvetrain: reed valve
- Oil system: premixed oil and fuel
- Cooling system: air-cooled
- Reduction gear: gearbox

=== Performance ===
- Power output: 34 hp (25 kW)

== See also ==
- List of aircraft engines
- Hirth F-263
- Rotax 377
