= Howland H-3 Pegasus =

American ultralight aircraft

H-3 Pegasus

General information
- Type: Ultralight aircraft and homebuilt aircraft
- National origin: United States
- Manufacturer: Howland Aero Design
- Designer: Bert Howland
- Status: Plans may still be available, kits still available
- Number built: 20 (2003)

History
- First flight: 1988
- Developed from: Howland H-2 Honey Bee

The Howland H-3 Pegasus is an American ultralight aircraft that was designed by Bert Howland and made available by Howland Aero Design in the form of plans for amateur construction, with kits provided by Aircraft Spruce & Specialty Co. The H-3 first flew in 1988.

== Design and development ==
The aircraft is a monoplane derivation of the biplane H-2 Honey Bee and was designed to comply with the US FAR 103 Ultralight Vehicles rules, including the category's maximum empty weight of 254 lb (115 kg). The aircraft has a standard empty weight of 252 lb (114 kg), when equipped with the now-out of production Rotax 277 single cylinder engine. If equipped with heavier engines it falls into the Experimental - Amateur-built category in its home country, although still qualifies as an ultralight in other countries, such as Canada. The H-3 features a cantilever low-wing, a single-seat, open cockpit, conventional landing gear and a single engine in tractor configuration.

The aircraft is made from wood and aluminium and covered in doped aircraft fabric covering. The fuselage is made from square aluminum tubing that is TIG welded and weighs 18 lb (8 kg) when completed. Its 25 ft (7.6 m) span wing is of a straight planform. The landing gear is conventional, with suspended main wheels and a steerable tailwheel. The cockpit is of an open design, with a small windshield. Controls are conventional three-axis, with ailerons, rudder and elevator.

Since the death of the designer plans have been intermittently available and were last provided by Classic Aero Enterprises. Aircraft Spruce and Specialty continue to provide raw materials kits.

The aircraft has an acceptable power range of 28 to 55 hp (21 to 41 kW). The use of the 28 hp (21 kW) Rotax 277, or the similar weight and power Hirth F-33, allows the aircraft to fit into the US ultralight category if weight is carefully controlled during construction. However the H-3 is underpowered with this engine and most have been equipped with heavier engines of higher output, such as the 40 hp (30 kW) Rotax 447 or the 50 hp (37 kW) Rotax 503. The 30 hp (22 kW) Hirth F-263 and 53 hp (40 kW) Hirth 2704 have also been used.

== Operational history ==
The H-3 won The Most Innovative Ultralight at Sun 'n Fun in 1989 and Best Commercial Ultralight at Sun 'n Fun 1990.

== Specifications (H-3) ==
Data from Cliche, Kitplanes and Purdy

General characteristics

- Crew: one
- Wingspan: 25 ft (7.6 m)
- Wing area: 110 sq ft (10 m^{2})
- Empty weight: 252 lb (114 kg)
- Gross weight: 550 lb (249 kg)
- Fuel capacity: 5 U.S. gallons (19 L; 4.2 imp gal)
- Powerplant: 1 × Rotax 277 single cylinder, two-stroke aircraft engine, with 2.5:1 reduction drive, 28 hp (21 kW)
- Propellers: 2-bladed wooden

Performance

- Maximum speed: 95 mph (153 km/h, 83 kn)
- Cruise speed: 55 mph (89 km/h, 48 kn)
- Stall speed: 27 mph (43 km/h, 23 kn)
- Range: 120 mi (190 km, 100 nmi)
- Service ceiling: 9,000 ft (2,700 m)
- g limits: +5/-3
- Rate of climb: 600 ft/min (3.0 m/s)
