= Hirth 2704 =

German two-stroke aircraft engine

Hirth 2704 & 2706
- Type: Twin cylinder two-stroke aircraft engine
- National origin: Germany
- Manufacturer: Hirth

The Hirth 2704 and 2706 are a family of in-line twin cylinder, two stroke, carburetted aircraft engines, with optional fuel injection, designed for use on ultralight aircraft and especially two seat ultralight trainers, single seat gyrocopters and small homebuilts. It was manufactured by Hirth of Germany.

The series is out of production and were replaced by the Hirth 3202 and 3203 in May 2002.

== Development ==
The 2706 was developed as a competitor to the 64 hp (48 kW) Rotax 582 and is similar to the Rotax powerplant in being a two-cylinder in-line engine, with dual capacitor discharge ignition, although it is air-cooled, compared to the 582's liquid cooling. The 2704 was developed from the 2706 as a de-rated version to compete with the 50 hp (37 kW) Rotax 503.

Both the 2704 and 2706 use free air or fan cooling, with dual Bing 34mm slide carburetors or optionally fuel injection. The cylinder walls are electrochemically coated with Nikasil. Standard starting is recoil start with electric start as an option. The reduction drive system available is the G-50 gearbox, with reduction ratios of 2.16:1, 2.29:1, 2.59:1, 3.16:1, or 3.65:1.

The engines run on a 50:1 pre-mix of unleaded 93 octane auto fuel and oil, or optionally 100:1 oil injection.

== Variants ==
2704
Twin-cylinder in-line, two stroke, aircraft engine with a single or dual Bing 34mm slide carburetor or fuel injection. Produces 53 hp (40 kW) at 5500 rpm and has a factory rated TBO of 1200 hours. Still in production.
2706
Twin-cylinder in-line, two stroke, aircraft engine with dual Bing 34mm slide carburetor or fuel injection. Produces 65 hp (48 kW) at 6200 rpm and has a factory rated TBO of 1000 hours. The 2706 was replaced in production in May 2002 by the Hirth 3203.

== Applications ==
2704

- Büttner Crazy Flyer
- Circa Reproductions Morane Saulnier N
- Flightstar
- Howland H-3 Pegasus
- Kolb Firestar
- LO 120 S
- Paladin Sparrow powered parachute
- Peak Aerospace Me 109R
- Silent Family Silent Racer

2706

- Aeros UL-2000 Flamingo
- American Sportscopter Ultrasport 331
- ASAP Beaver RX 550 Plus
- Bede BD-5
- CGS Hawk
- Eagle's Perch helicopter
- Fisher Classic
- Harmening High Flyer
- Howland H-2 Honey Bee
- Joplin Tundra
- Kamov Ka-137 UAV helicopter
- Kolb Mark III
- Laron Wizard
- Paladin Golden Eagle
- Paraplane GE-2 Golden Eagle
- Paratrek Angel 2-B
- Pawnee Warrior
- Powrachute Pegasus
- Raj Hamsa Clipper
- Raj Hamsa X-Air
- Revolution Mini 500 helicopter
- Rans S-12 Airaile
- Silent Family Silent Racer
- Skymaster Excel
- Summit 2
- US Light Aircraft Hornet

== Specifications (2704) ==
Data from Recreational Power Engineering

=== General characteristics ===
- Type: Twin cylinder, two-stroke, in-line, aircraft engine
- Bore: 76 mm (3.0 in)
- Stroke: 69 mm (2.7 in)
- Displacement: 625 cc (38.1 cu in)
- Length: 377 mm (14.8 in)
- Width: 450 mm (17.7 in)
- Height: 383 mm (15.1 in)
- Dry weight: 73 lb (33.1 kg) with free air cooling, 79 lb (35.8 kg) with fan cooling, including recoil starter and exhaust. G-50 gearbox adds an additional 19 lb (8.6 kg)

=== Components ===
- Fuel system: 2 X Bing 34mm slide type carburetor
- Fuel type: unleaded 93 octane auto fuel
- Oil system: 50:1 fuel/oil premix or oil injection
- Cooling system: free air or fan
- Reduction gear: G-50 gearbox with reduction ratios of 2.16:1, 2.29:1, 2.59:1, 3.16:1, or 3.65:1

=== Performance ===
- Power output: 53 hp (40 kW) at 5500 rpm
- Compression ratio: 9.5:1

== See also ==
- Arrow 500
