= American Sportscopter Ultrasport 254 =

American helicopter

Ultrasport 254

General information
- Type: Helicopter
- National origin: United States
- Manufacturer: American Sportscopter; Light's American Sportscopter Inc
- Status: Production completed
- Number built: 18 (2005)

History
- First flight: July 1993
- Variants: American Sportscopter Ultrasport 331; American Sportscopter Ultrasport 496

The American Sportscopter Ultrasport 254 is an American helicopter that was designed and produced by American Sportscopter and first flown in July 1993. The aircraft was produced by Light's American Sportscopter Inc from 1999. The aircraft was supplied as a kit for amateur construction.

== Design and development ==
The aircraft was designed to comply with the US FAR 103 Ultralight Vehicles rules, including the category's maximum empty weight of 254 lb (115 kg). The aircraft has a standard empty weight of 252 lb (114 kg). It features a single main rotor, an enclosed cockpit with a windshield, skid-type landing gear and a twin cylinder, air-cooled, two-stroke, single-ignition 55 hp (41 kW) Hirth 2703 engine.

The aircraft fuselage fairing is made from composites. Its 21 ft (6.4 m) diameter main rotor employs an ATI 012 (VR-7 mod) airfoil at the blade root, becoming an ATI 008 (VR-7 mod) at the tip. The main and tail rotor blades are of honeycomb composite construction. The cyclic control is roof-mounted, hanging down into the cockpit, but is otherwise conventional. The 23 in (58.4 cm) diameter tail rotor features a shrouded tail rotor and a tailplane with end-fins.

When it was available, the aircraft could be purchased as a 150-hour assembly kit or as a 60-hour quick-build kit. No plans were available.

== Specifications (Ultrasport 254) ==
Data from Cliche and KitPlanes

General characteristics

- Crew: one
- Length: 19.2 ft (5.9 m)
- Empty weight: 252 lb (114 kg)
- Gross weight: 525 lb (238 kg)
- Fuel capacity: 5 U.S. gallons (19 L; 4.2 imp gal)
- Powerplant: 1 × Hirth 2703 twin cylinder, air-cooled, two-stroke dual-ignition aircraft engine, 55 hp (41 kW)
- Main rotor diameter: 21 ft 0 in (6.40 m)
- Main rotor area: 346 sq ft (32.1 m^{2})

Performance

- Maximum speed: 63 mph (101 km/h, 55 kn)
- Cruise speed: 63 mph (101 km/h, 55 kn)
- Range: 75 mi (121 km, 65 nmi)
- g limits: +/-2.3g
- Rate of climb: 1,000 ft/min (5.1 m/s)
- Disk loading: 1.50 lb/sq ft (7.3 kg/m^{2})

== See also ==
- List of rotorcraft
