= American Sportscopter =

American aircraft manufacturer based in Newport News, Virginia

American Sportscopter, Inc.
- Company type: Privately held company
- Industry: Aerospace
- Founded: before 1998
- Fate: Out of business circa 2009
- Headquarters: Newport News, Virginia, United States
- Products: Kit aircraft
- Website: www.ultrasport.rotor.com

American Sportscopter, Inc., also called American Sportscopter International, Inc., was an American aircraft manufacturer based in Newport News, Virginia. The company specialized in the design and manufacture of helicopters in the form of the Ultrasport line of kits for amateur construction in the homebuilt aircraft and the US FAR 103 Ultralight Vehicles categories.

The company was formed before 1998 and seems to have gone out of business by 2010.

The company's first product was the American Sportscopter Ultrasport 254, a single-seat helicopter with an empty weight of 254 lb (115 kg) for the US FAR 103 Ultralight Vehicles category. This was followed by a heavier and more capable single-seat design for the homebuilt category, the American Sportscopter Ultrasport 331. There were also two-seat trainers, the American Sportscopter Ultrasport 496. All models were named for their empty weight, in pounds.

== Aircraft ==
Summary of aircraft built by American Sportscopter
Model name	First flight	Number built	Type
American Sportscopter Ultrasport 254		18 (2005)	Single seat FAR Part 103 helicopter
American Sportscopter Ultrasport 331		6 (2014)	Single seat amateur-built helicopter
American Sportscopter Ultrasport 496		7 (2014)	Two-seat amateur-built helicopter
