= American Sportscopter Ultrasport 496 =

American helicopter

Ultrasport 496

General information
- Type: Helicopter
- National origin: United States
- Manufacturer: American Sportscopter
- Status: Production completed
- Number built: At least seven

History
- First flight: July 1995
- Developed from: Ultrasport 254
- Variants: Hexiang WD-200; LAE Ultrasport 496T

The American Sportscopter Ultrasport 496 is an American helicopter that was designed and produced by American Sportscopter of Newport News, Virginia. Now out of production, when it was available the aircraft was supplied as a kit for amateur construction.

== Design and development ==
The Ultrasport 496 is a two-seat trainer development of the Ultrasport 254 and, like that model, is named for its empty weight in pounds. The aircraft was designed to comply with the US Experimental - Amateur-built aircraft rules. It could also have been registered as a FAR 103 Ultralight Vehicles rules exemption trainer. It features a single main rotor, a two-seats in side-by-side configuration enclosed cockpit with optional doors, skid-type landing gear and a four-cylinder, horizontally opposed, air-cooled, two-stroke, dual-ignition 95 hp (71 kW) Hirth F-30 engine.

The aircraft fuselage is made from composites. Its 23.00 ft (7.0 m) diameter two-bladed rotor employs an ATI 012 (VR-7 mod) airfoil at the blade root, transitioning to an ATI 008 (VR-7 mod) airfoil at the tip. The dual controls include cyclic controls mounted from the cockpit ceiling, but are otherwise conventional. The tail rotor is ring-mounted and the horizontal tailplane mounts end-fins for directional stability. A ballistic parachute was a factory option.

The aircraft has an empty weight of 495 lb (225 kg) and a gross weight of 1,085 lb (492 kg), giving a useful load of 590 lb (268 kg). With full fuel of 16 U.S. gallons (61 L; 13 imp gal) the payload for crew and baggage is 494 lb (224 kg).

The manufacturer estimated the construction time from the supplied kit as 60 hours.

== Operational history ==
In June 2014 one example was registered in the United States with the Federal Aviation Administration, although a total of seven had been registered at one time.

== Specifications (Ultrasport 496) ==
Data from Purdy

General characteristics

- Crew: one
- Capacity: one passenger
- Length: 20 ft 0 in (6.10 m)
- Empty weight: 495 lb (225 kg)
- Gross weight: 1,085 lb (492 kg)
- Fuel capacity: 16 U.S. gallons (61 L; 13 imp gal)
- Powerplant: 1 × Hirth F-30 four cylinder, horizontally opposed, air-cooled, two stroke aircraft engine, 95 hp (71 kW)
- Main rotor diameter: 23 ft 0 in (7.01 m)
- Main rotor area: 415 sq ft (38.6 m^{2})

Performance

- Cruise speed: 65 mph (105 km/h, 56 kn)
- Never exceed speed: 98 mph (158 km/h, 85 kn)
- Range: 150 mi (240 km, 130 nmi)
- Service ceiling: 12,000 ft (3,700 m)
- Rate of climb: 1,000 ft/min (5.1 m/s)
- Disk loading: 2.61 lb/sq ft (12.7 kg/m^{2})

== See also ==
- List of rotorcraft
