= Airmotive EOS 001 =

American homebuilt aircraft

EOS 001
- The prototype EOS 001

General information
- Type: Homebuilt aircraft
- National origin: United States
- Manufacturer: Airmotive Engineers
- Status: Production completed
- Number built: At least two

History
- Introduction date: 1978

The Airmotive EOS 001 is an American homebuilt aircraft that was designed and produced by Airmotive Engineers of Pontiac, Michigan. The aircraft was supplied as a kit for amateur construction, but is no longer available.

== Design and development ==
The aircraft features a cantilever low-wing, a single-seat, enclosed open cockpit under a bubble canopy, retractable tricycle landing gear and a single engine in tractor configuration.

The aircraft is made from bonded and pop riveted aluminum sheet and has a 26.0 ft (7.9 m) span wing. Optimized for simplicity of construction, the design has no compound curves and requires no jigs or special tools. The standard engine intended to be supplied with the kit was the 55 hp (41 kW) two-stroke Hirth 2702 powerplant with a reduction gearbox that allowed the propeller to operate at lower tip speeds. This engine permits the EOS 001 to cruise at 187 mph (301 km/h) and achieve a top level speed of 200 mph (322 km/h). The prototype was equipped with a Volkswagen air-cooled engine.

The aircraft has an empty weight of 320 lb (150 kg) and a gross weight of 750 lb (340 kg), giving a useful load of 430 lb (200 kg). With full fuel of 20 U.S. gallons (76 L; 17 imp gal) the payload is 310 lb (140 kg).

In 1978 the claimed completion cost was US$2,000, not counting labor.

== Operational history ==
The prototype EOS 001 was registered in the United States with the Federal Aviation Administration (FAA) in 1978.

By October 2013 two examples, including the prototype, had been at one time registered in the United States with the FAA, but both registrations were later canceled and it is likely that no examples of this type exist today.

== Specifications (version) ==
Data from Plane and Pilot

General characteristics

- Crew: one
- Length: 16 ft 1 in (4.90 m)
- Wingspan: 26 ft 0 in (7.92 m)
- Empty weight: 320 lb (145 kg)
- Gross weight: 750 lb (340 kg)
- Fuel capacity: 20 U.S. gallons (76 L; 17 imp gal)
- Powerplant: 1 × Hirth 2702 twin cylinder, air-cooled, two stroke aircraft engine, 55 hp (41 kW)
- Propellers: 2-bladed fixed pitch

Performance

- Maximum speed: 200 mph (320 km/h, 170 kn)
- Cruise speed: 116 mph (187 km/h, 101 kn)
- Stall speed: 52 mph (84 km/h, 45 kn)
- Rate of climb: 2,160 ft/min (11.0 m/s)
