= American Sportscopter Ultrasport 331 =

American helicopter

Ultrasport 331

General information
- Type: Helicopter
- National origin: United States
- Manufacturer: American Sportscopter
- Status: Production completed
- Number built: At least six

History
- Developed from: Ultrasport 254
- Variant: Hexiang WD-100

The American Sportscopter Ultrasport 331 is an American helicopter that was designed and produced by American Sportscopter of Newport News, Virginia. Now out of production, when it was available the aircraft was supplied as a kit for amateur construction.

== Design and development ==
The Ultrasport 331 is a development of the Ultrasport 254 and, like that model, is named for its empty weight in pounds. The aircraft was designed to comply with the US Experimental - Amateur-built aircraft rules. It features a single main rotor, a single-seat enclosed cockpit with doors, skid-type landing gear and a twin cylinder, air-cooled, two-stroke, dual-ignition 65 hp (48 kW) Hirth 2706 engine.

The aircraft fuselage is made from composites. Its 21.00 ft (6.4 m) diameter two-bladed rotor has a chord of 6.7 in (17.0 cm) and employs an ATI 012 (VR-7 mod) airfoil at the blade root, transitioning to an ATI 008 (VR-7 mod) airfoil at the tip. The ring-mounted tail rotor has a 2.60 ft (0.8 m) diameter and a chord of 2 in (5.1 cm). The cyclic control is mounted from the cockpit ceiling, but otherwise is conventional. The horizontal tailplane mounts end-fins for directional stability.

The aircraft has an empty weight of 330 lb (150 kg) and a gross weight of 680 lb (308 kg), giving a useful load of 350 lb (159 kg). With full fuel of 10 U.S. gallons (38 L; 8.3 imp gal) the payload is 290 lb (132 kg).

The manufacturer estimated the construction time from the supplied kit as 60 hours.

== Operational history ==
By June 2014 three examples had been registered in the United States with the Federal Aviation Administration, although a total of six had been registered at one time.

== Specifications (Ultrasport 331) ==
Data from Purdy

General characteristics

- Crew: one
- Length: 19 ft 0 in (5.79 m)
- Empty weight: 330 lb (150 kg)
- Gross weight: 680 lb (308 kg)
- Fuel capacity: 10 U.S. gallons (38 L; 8.3 imp gal)
- Powerplant: 1 × Hirth 2706 twin cylinder, air-cooled, four stroke aircraft engine, 65 hp (48 kW)
- Main rotor diameter: 21 ft 0 in (6.40 m)
- Main rotor area: 346 sq ft (32.1 m^{2})

Performance

- Cruise speed: 63 mph (101 km/h, 55 kn)
- Never exceed speed: 104 mph (167 km/h, 90 kn)
- Range: 150 mi (240 km, 130 nmi)
- Service ceiling: 12,000 ft (3,700 m)
- Rate of climb: 1,000 ft/min (5.1 m/s)
- Disk loading: 1.96 lb/sq ft (9.6 kg/m^{2})

== See also ==
- List of rotorcraft
