= LAE Ultrasport 496T =

Cypriot ultralight helicopter

Ultrasport 496T

General information
- Type: Helicopter
- National origin: Cyprus
- Manufacturer: LAE Helicopters Cyprus
- Status: Production completed

History
- Developed from: American Sportscopter Ultrasport 496

The LAE Ultrasport 496T is a Cypriot helicopter that was produced by LAE Helicopters Cyprus of Larnaca. Now out of production, when it was available the aircraft was supplied complete and ready-to-fly.

The aircraft was reportedly in production in 2015, but by the end of 2017 production had ended in favour of the new LAE Piranha.

== Design and development ==
The Ultrasport 496T is derived from the American Sportscopter Ultrasport 496, replacing the two-stroke powerplant with a turboshaft engine.

The 496T was designed to comply with the European Class 6 microlight helicopter rules. It features a single main rotor and tail rotor, a two-seats-in side-by-side configuration enclosed cockpit with a windshield, skid landing gear and a 160 hp (119 kW) Solar T62 turbine engine.

The aircraft fuselage is made from composites. It has a two-bladed main and a ring-mounted tailrotor. The aircraft has a typical empty weight of 260 kg (573 lb) and a gross weight of 450 kg (992 lb), giving a useful load of 190 kg (419 lb).

Reviewer Werner Pfaendler, noted that it has "an exceptional power to weight ratio".

== Specifications (Ultrasport 496T) ==
Data from Tacke

General characteristics

- Crew: one
- Capacity: one passenger
- Empty weight: 260 kg (573 lb)
- Gross weight: 450 kg (992 lb)
- Powerplant: 1 × Solar T62 turboshaft engine, 120 kW (160 hp)

== See also ==
- List of rotorcraft
