= Aeros UL-2000 Flamingo =

UL-2000 Flamingo

General information
- Type: Ultralight aircraft
- National origin: Czech Republic
- Manufacturer: Aeros SRO (CZ)
- Status: In production

History
- Manufactured: 2000–present
- Introduction date: 2001

The Aeros UL-2000 Flamingo is a Czech ultralight aircraft, designed produced by Aeros SRO (CZ) of Kutná Hora. It was introduced at the Aero show held in Friedrichshafen in 2001.

== Design and development ==
The aircraft was designed to comply with the Fédération Aéronautique Internationale microlight rules. It features a cantilever high-wing, a two-seats-in-side-by-side configuration enclosed cockpit, tricycle landing gear and a single engine in tractor configuration.

The UL-2000 is made from composites and has a cabin width of 110 cm (43 in). Its 8.6 m (28.2 ft) span wing employs flaps. The controls are conventional, with push-rod controlled elevators, rudder and flaps. Standard engines available are the 100 hp (75 kW) Rotax 912ULS or Verner 1400S four-stroke engines and the 110 hp (82 kW) Hirth F30 and the 65 hp (48 kW) Hirth 2706 two-stroke powerplants.

== Specifications (Flamingo) ==
Data from Bayerl

General characteristics

- Crew: one
- Capacity: one passenger
- Wingspan: 8.6 m (28 ft 3 in)
- Wing area: 10.5 m^{2} (113 sq ft)
- Gross weight: 450 kg (992 lb)
- Fuel capacity: 75 litres (16 imp gal; 20 US gal)
- Powerplant: 1 × Rotax 912ULS four cylinder, liquid and air-cooled, four stroke, 75 kW (101 hp)

Performance

- Maximum speed: 240 km/h (150 mph, 130 kn)
- Cruise speed: 180 km/h (110 mph, 97 kn)
- Stall speed: 62 km/h (39 mph, 33 kn)
- Rate of climb: 6.5 m/s (1,280 ft/min)
