= VRT 300 =

Russian unmanned helicopter

VRT-300
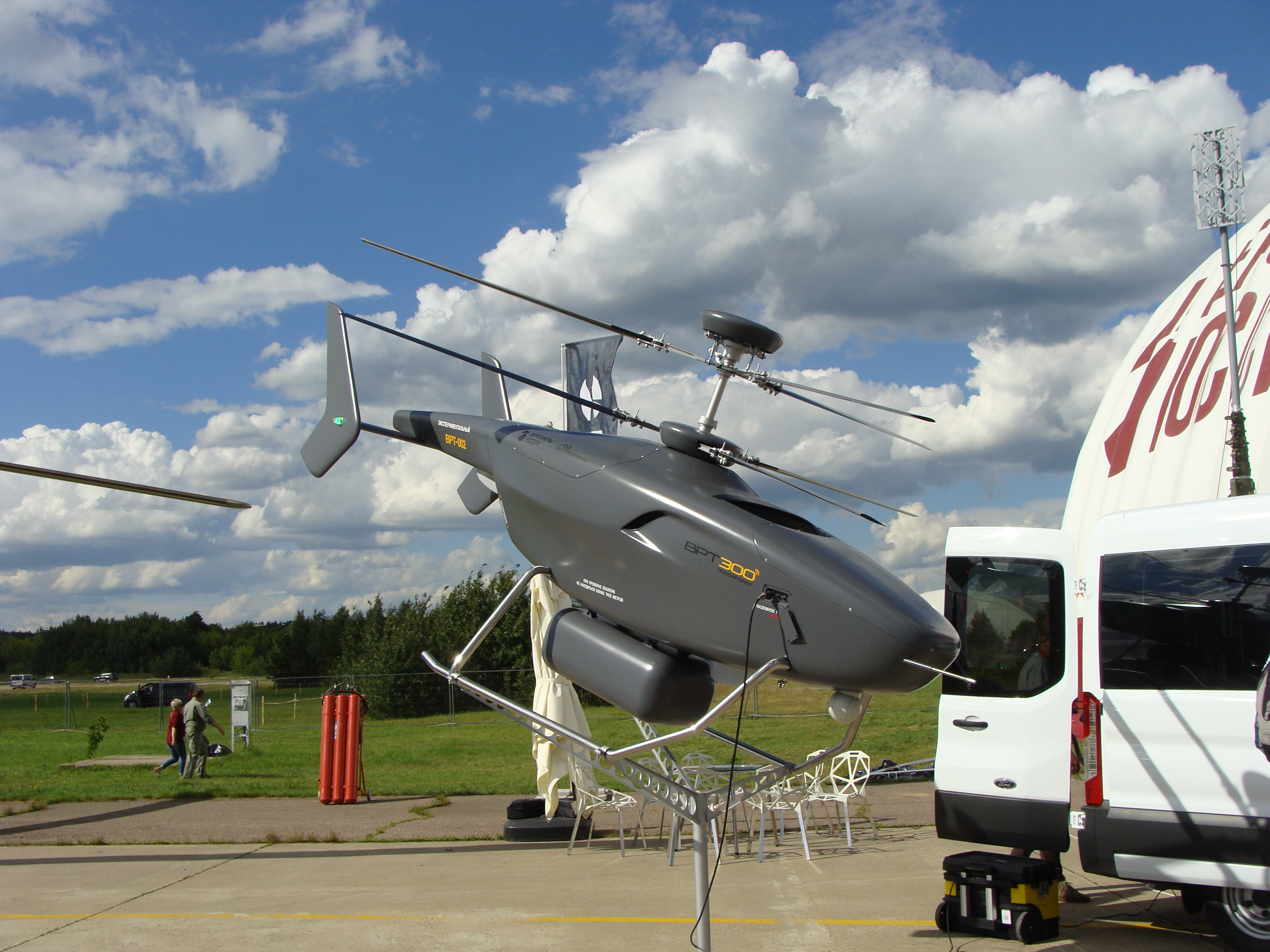

General information
- Type: Unmanned aerial vehicle (UAV)
- Manufacturer: Russian Helicopters

History
- First flight: 2019

The VRT 300 (Russian: ВРТ 300) is a Russian unmanned helicopter. It was introduced at the MAKS airshow in 2017.

It was constructed for arctic ice patrols in support of safe maritime navigation. Another version of the VRT300, Opticvision, boasts an increased range of flight for monitoring and remote probing.

== Specifications ==
Data from

General characteristics

Performance

- Maximum speed: 180 km/h (110 mph, 97 kn)
- Range: 150 km (93 mi, 81 nmi)
- Endurance: 5 hrs
- Maximum take-off weight: 300 kg
- Payload weight: 70 kg
- Maximum range of communication with line of sight at flight altitude: 100 km

== See also ==
- VRT 500
- Kamov Ka-137
