= LTD LO-120S =

German ultralight aircraft

LO-120S

General information
- Type: Ultralight aircraft and motor glider
- National origin: Germany
- Manufacturer: Logistik-Technik
- Status: In production (2011)

History
- Developed from: LO 120 S

The LTD LO-120 is a German ultralight aircraft, produced by Logistik-Technik, of Baindt and based on the earlier LO 120 S produced by LO-Fluggerrätebau. The aircraft is supplied as a kit for amateur construction or as a complete ready-to-fly-aircraft.

== Design and development ==
The LO-120 was designed to comply with the Fédération Aéronautique Internationale microlight rules. It features a cantilever high-wing, a two-seats-in-tandem open cockpit with a small windshield, fixed tricycle landing gear and a single engine in pusher configuration.

The aircraft is made from wood, with its flying surfaces covered in doped aircraft fabric. Its 15.5 m (50.9 ft) span soaring wing has an area of 16 m^{2} (170 sq ft) and can be quickly swapped for an alternate, reduced span microlight touring wing that increases cruising speed. The tail is an inverted V-tail mounted to twin booms. The standard engine is the 40 hp (30 kW) Rotax 447 two-stroke powerplant.

Cockpit access is via a sliding fairing.

== Specifications (LO-120S) ==
Data from Bayerl

General characteristics

- Crew: one
- Capacity: one passenger
- Wingspan: 15.5 m (50 ft 10 in) (soaring wing)
- Wing area: 16 m^{2} (170 sq ft)
- Empty weight: 220 kg (485 lb)
- Gross weight: 400 kg (882 lb)
- Fuel capacity: 70 litres (15 imp gal; 18 US gal)
- Powerplant: 1 × Rotax 447 twin cylinder, air-cooled, two stroke aircraft engine, 30 kW (40 hp)

Performance

- Maximum speed: 150 km/h (93 mph, 81 kn)
- Cruise speed: 130 km/h (81 mph, 70 kn)
- Stall speed: 60 km/h (37 mph, 32 kn)
- Rate of climb: 3.5 m/s (690 ft/min)
- Wing loading: 25 kg/m^{2} (5.1 lb/sq ft)
