= Alliant Destiny Fusion =

Destiny Fusion

General information
- Type: Powered parachute
- National origin: United States
- Manufacturer: Alliant Aviation

The Alliant Destiny Fusion is an American two-seat powered parachute, designed and produced by Alliant Aviation based at Richland, Michigan.

== Design and development ==
The aircraft was designed to comply with the FAI Microlight rules. It features a parachute-style high-wing and two-seats in tandem in a semi-stressed fibreglass cockpit, tricycle landing gear and a single 52 hp (39 kW) Rotax 503 engine in pusher configuration. Versions were also available with a Rotax 582 or Hirth 3701 engine.

== Specifications (Rotax 503) ==
Data from World Directory of Leisure Aviation 2004/2005

General characteristics

- Crew: two
- Wing area: 540 sq ft (50 m^{2})
- Empty weight: 340 lb (154 kg)
- Gross weight: 849 lb (385 kg)
- Powerplant: 1 × Rotax 503 twin cylinder, two-stroke, liquid-cooled aircraft engine, 52 hp (39 kW)
- Propellers: 3-bladed

Performance

- Cruise speed: 29 mph (47 km/h, 25 kn)
- Rate of climb: 1,080 ft/min (5.5 m/s)
