= Hirth 2702 =

German two-stroke aircraft engine

Hirth 2702 & 2703
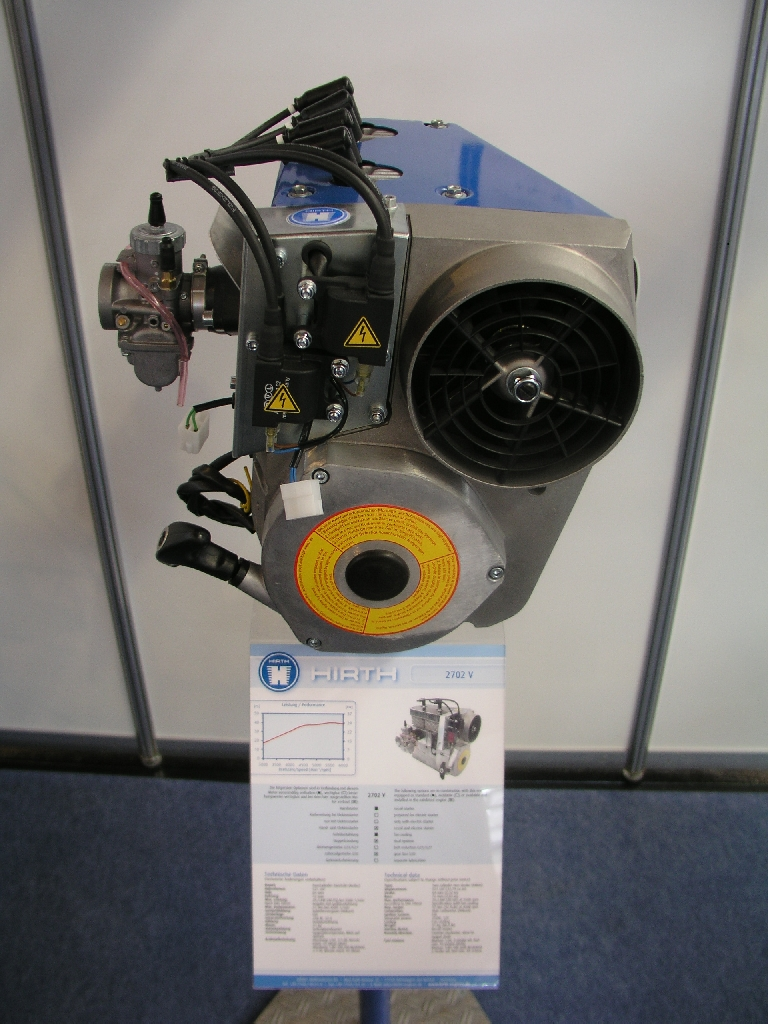
- Hirth 2702
- Type: Twin cylinder two-stroke aircraft engine
- National origin: Germany
- Manufacturer: Hirth

The Hirth 2702 and 2703 are a family of in-line twin cylinder, two stroke, carburetted aircraft engines designed for use on ultralight aircraft and especially two seat ultralight trainers, single seat gyrocopters, and small homebuilts. It is manufactured by Hirth of Germany.

== Development ==
The 2703 was developed as a competitor to the 50 hp (37 kW) Rotax 503 and is similar to the Rotax powerplant in being a two-cylinder in-line engine, with dual capacitor discharge ignition. The 2702 was developed from the 2703 as a de-rated version.

Both the 2702 and 2703 use free air or fan cooling, with Bing 34mm slide carburetors. The cylinder walls are electrochemically coated with Nikasil. Standard starting is recoil start. Reduction drive systems available are the G-50 gearbox with reduction ratios of 2.16:1, 2.29:1, 2.59:1, 3.16:1, or 3.65:1, or a multi-element cog belt drive. A tuned exhaust and electric start are optional.

The engines runs on a 50:1 pre-mix of unleaded 93 octane auto fuel and oil.

== Variants ==
2702
Twin-cylinder in-line, two stroke, aircraft engine with a single Bing 34mm slide carburetor. Produces 40 hp (30 kW) at 5500 rpm and has a factory rated TBO of 1200 hours. Still in production.
2703
Twin-cylinder in-line, two stroke, aircraft engine with dual or optionally a single Bing 34mm slide carburetor. Produces 55 hp (41 kW) at 6200 rpm and has a factory rated TBO of 1000 hours. The 2703 has been largely supplanted in production by the Hirth 3202, but in 2009 was still available as a special order from the factory.

== Applications ==
2702

- Airfer Transan
- Brutsche Freedom 40
- Flightstar
- Hy-Tek Hurricane 103
- ISON Airbike
- Preceptor N3 Pup
- Spacek SD-1 Minisport

2703

- Airfer Transan
- Airmotive EOS 001
- American Sportscopter Ultrasport 254
- CGS Hawk
- Exkluziv Joker
- Falconar Golden Hawk
- Kolb Firestar
- RemSchetMash Robust
- US Light Aircraft Hornet

== Specifications (2702) ==
Data from Recreational Power Engineering

=== General characteristics ===
- Type: Twin cylinder, two-stroke, in-line, aircraft engine
- Bore: 72 mm (2.8 in)
- Stroke: 64 mm (2.5 in)
- Displacement: 521 cc (31.8 cu in)
- Length: 413 mm (16.3 in)
- Width: 450 mm (17.7 in)
- Height: 376 mm (14.8 in)
- Dry weight: 70 lb (31.8 kg) with free air cooling, 76 lb (34.5 kg) with fan cooling, including recoil starter and exhaust. G-50 gearbox adds an additional 19 lb (8.6 kg)

=== Components ===
- Fuel system: 1 X Bing 34mm slide type carburetor
- Fuel type: unleaded 93 octane auto fuel
- Oil system: 50:1 fuel/oil premix
- Cooling system: free air or fan
- Reduction gear: G-50 gearbox with reduction ratios of 2.16:1, 2.29:1, 2.59:1, 3.16:1, or 3.65:1, or a multi-element cog belt drive

=== Performance ===
- Power output: 40 hp (30 kW) at 5500 rpm
- Compression ratio: 9.5:1

== See also ==
- Kawasaki 440
