= Alliant Aviation =

American powered parachute manufacturer

Alliant Aviation LLC
- Company type: Limited liability company
- Industry: Aerospace
- Founded: circa 2003
- Defunct: circa 2005
- Fate: Out of business
- Headquarters: Richland, Michigan, United States
- Products: Powered parachutes

Alliant Aviation LLC was an American aircraft manufacturer based in Three Rivers, Michigan and later in Richland, Michigan. The company specialized in the design and manufacture of powered parachutes in the form of ready-to-fly aircraft for the US FAR 103 Ultralight Vehicles and the European Fédération Aéronautique Internationale microlight categories. None of the company's aircraft appear on the list of accepted American light-sport aircraft.

Alliant was formed about 2003 as a restructuring of Destiny Powered Parachutes. The new company retained the same address in Three Rivers, Michigan for a time, before moving to nearby Richland, Michigan. Alliant was a limited liability company (LLC).

The new company showed its first new aircraft, the Alliant Destiny Fusion at Sun 'n Fun, Lakeland, Florida in 2003. The Fusion featured an unusual semi-stressed skin composite fuselage. The company line included the Destiny LT two-seater, Destiny ST single-seater and the Destiny XLT two-seater. In about 2004 the ParaCraft Falcon F-1 was introduced.

The company seems to have gone out of business about 2005.

== Aircraft ==
Summary of aircraft built by Alliant
Model name	First flight	Number built	Type
Fusion	2003		Two-seat powered parachute
Destiny LT	2003		Two-seat powered parachute
Destiny XLT	2003		Two-seat powered parachute
Destiny ST	2003		Single-seat powered parachute
Paracraft F-1 Falcon	2004		Two-seat powered parachute
