= Circa Reproductions Morane Saulnier N =

Canadian homebuilt light aircraft

Morane Saulnier N

General information
- Type: Amateur-built aircraft
- National origin: Canada
- Manufacturer: Circa Reproductions
- Designer: Graham Lee
- Status: Plans available (2012)

History
- Developed from: Morane-Saulnier N

The Circa Reproductions Morane Saulnier N, also called the Bullet, is a Canadian amateur-built aircraft that was designed by Graham Lee and produced by Circa Reproductions, of Surrey, British Columbia. The aircraft is supplied as plans for amateur construction.

The aircraft is a 90% scale replica of the First World War French Morane-Saulnier N fighter.

== Design and development ==
The aircraft features a cable-braced mid-wing, a single-seat open cockpit, fixed conventional landing gear and a single engine in tractor configuration.

The aircraft is made from bolted-together aluminum tubing, with 1/8 in (3.2 mm) plywood fuselage formers and stringers, with its flying surfaces covered in doped aircraft fabric. Its 23.9 ft (7.3 m) span wing has an area of 117.5 sq ft (10.92 m^{2}). Standard engines recommended are the 50 hp (37 kW) Rotax 503 and the 53 hp (40 kW) Hirth 2704 two-stroke. The 60 hp (45 kW) Volkswagen air-cooled engine four-stroke powerplant can be used, but the requirement for a smaller diameter propeller reduces performance.

== Specifications (Morane Saulnier N) ==
Data from Bayerl and Circa Reproductions

General characteristics

- Crew: one
- Length: 19 ft 3 in (5.87 m)
- Wingspan: 23 ft 10 in (7.26 m)
- Height: 6 ft (1.8 m) approximately
- Wing area: 117.5 sq ft (10.92 m^{2})
- Empty weight: 275 lb (125 kg)
- Gross weight: 600 lb (272 kg)
- Fuel capacity: 12 U.S. gallons (45 L; 10.0 imp gal)
- Powerplant: 1 × Rotax 503 twin cylinder, air-cooled, two stroke aircraft engine, 50 hp (37 kW)
- Propellers: 2-bladed wooden

Performance

- Maximum speed: 99 mph (160 km/h, 86 kn)
- Cruise speed: 71 mph (115 km/h, 62 kn)
- Stall speed: 30 mph (48 km/h, 26 kn)
- Never exceed speed: 115 mph (185 km/h, 100 kn)
- g limits: +5.7/-2.8
- Rate of climb: 640 ft/min (3.25 m/s)
