= VRT 500 =

Type of aircraft

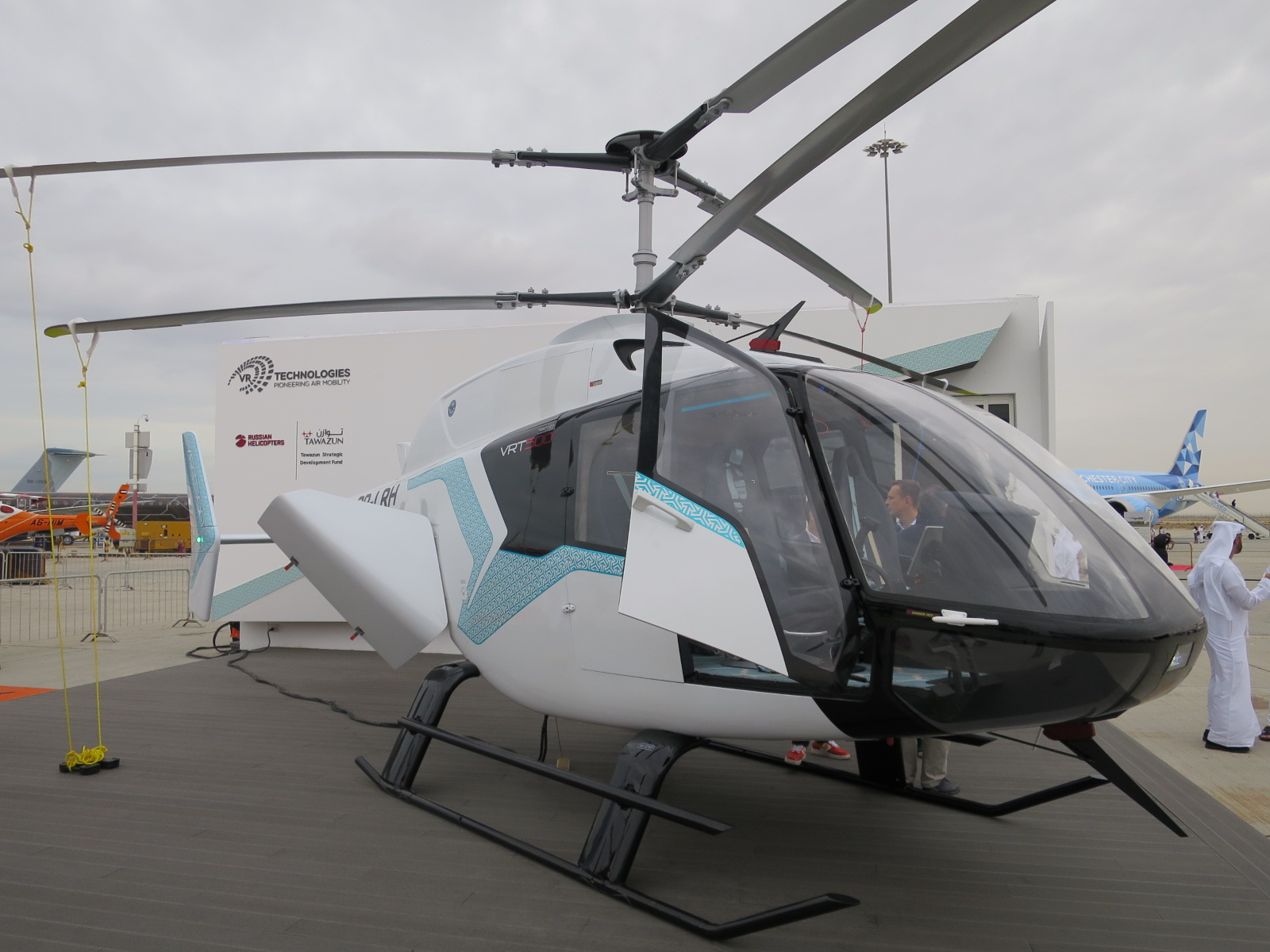
- VRT 500 mockup at Dubai Air Show 2019

General information
- Type: Light Helicopter
- Manufacturer: Russian Helicopters
- Designer: VR Technologies
- Status: In development

History
- Introduction date: 2023-24
- First flight: Late 2020

The VRT 500 is a project of a light helicopter with a coaxial rotor developed by VR-Technologies (VRT), a subsidiary of Russian Helicopters.

== Development ==
First announced in March 2007, a mock-up was presented at the 2017 MAKS airshow, Russian type certification might come in 2017 and series production is planned for 2020–21. Rotor system strength were tested in 2018 before aerodynamic tests, while a prototype will be produced by the end of 2019. It targets 15% of the sub 2 tons global civil market, 700 helicopters by 2030, First flight was scheduled for 2019 as 1,000 units could be sold by 2035.

In August 2019, Malaysian company Ludev Aviation ordered five aircraft. At the November 2019 Dubai Air Show, Abu Dhabi holding company Tawazun announced it will purchase 50% of VR-Technologies in the first quarter of 2020, while Swedish company Rotorcraft Nordic AB announced an order for 10 helicopters. At the same airshow, the Pratt & Whitney Canada PW207V engine selection was announced.

The helicopter will be built in Italy, near Rome, and targets EASA certification like the Kamov Ka-32 for firefighting and aerial work. The development is estimated at €400 million ($440 million), first flight is planned in 2020 and type certification in 2022. From 2023, a hybrid propulsion system with a 3-5 min battery pack may overcome the ban on single-engine helicopters in some cities. A production line could be established in the United Arab Emirates.

== Design ==
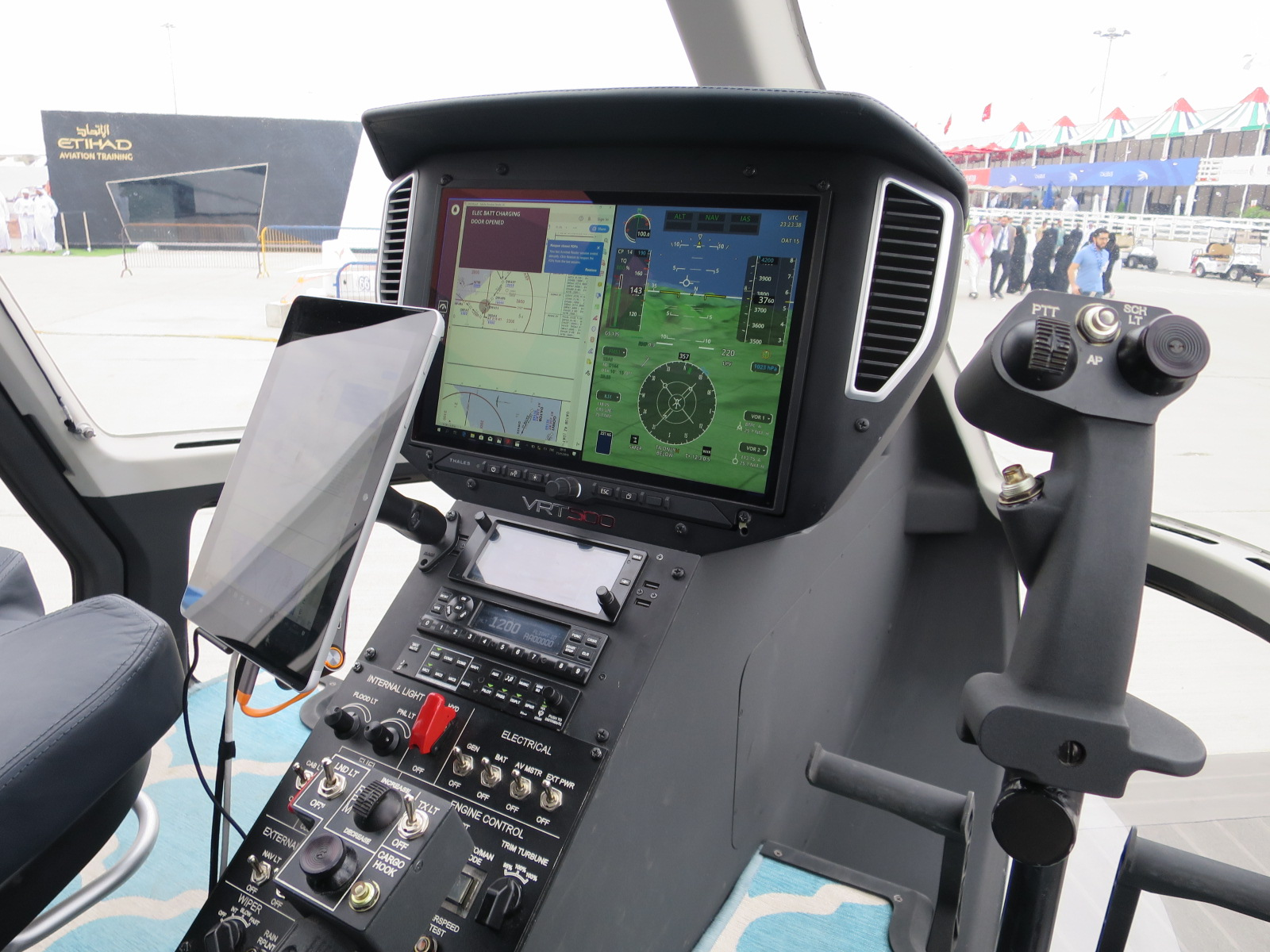
VRT 500 mockup cockpit at Dubai Air Show 2019

The single-engine aircraft has twin three-blade coaxial rotors. The most likely western powerplant is the Safran Arrius. It features shaped carbon fiber main blades to cut noise emissions, composite construction, a glass cockpit and sliding rear cabin doors, and will compete with the Bell 505 and Robinson R66. Multiple configurations will be provided: passenger, utility, cargo, training, VIP, and Medevac with rear cabin doors loading. The helicopter can carry a payload of up to 730 kg, can reach a max speed of 250 km/h and has a flight range of 860 km.

The 1.65 t (3,600 lb) helicopter has a metallic airframe with composite skins and is powered by a single Pratt & Whitney PW207V, like the Ansat light twin. The coaxial rotor, a Kamov Design Bureau speciality, allow a compact fuselage, simpler ground operations and reduced noise for urban transport. VRT is helped by Italian automotive designer Italdesign, the avionics come from Thales and the environmental control system from Liebherr. It competes with $1–2 million helicopters like the Bell 505 Jet Ranger X, Robinson R66 or Enstrom 480 but with a larger cabin.

=== Configurations ===
The VRT500 can have multiple configurations besides baseline:

- Passenger or air taxi : up to 5 energy-absorbing passenger seats, adequate luggage compartment loaded from the cabin or through rear doors
- Cargo : up to 730 kg payload within 5.3 m^{3} and courier seat, up to 900 kg camera-monitored sling payload
- Corporate : 2 luxury seats with a rear console or VIP on individual order
- Public safety : with external speakers, searchlight, thermal imager and other devices connected to avionics with non-certified software for special missions, simplified interior with up to 5 shoulder straps
- Medical evacuation : medical module with a special medical floor and cladding, medical cabinet, stand for medical equipment, standardized stretchers loaded through the rear doors, oxygen cylinders stand, medical spot lamp, paramedic's seat, inflight medical assistance
- Training : simplified interior with removable second control kit for the instructor

== Specifications ==
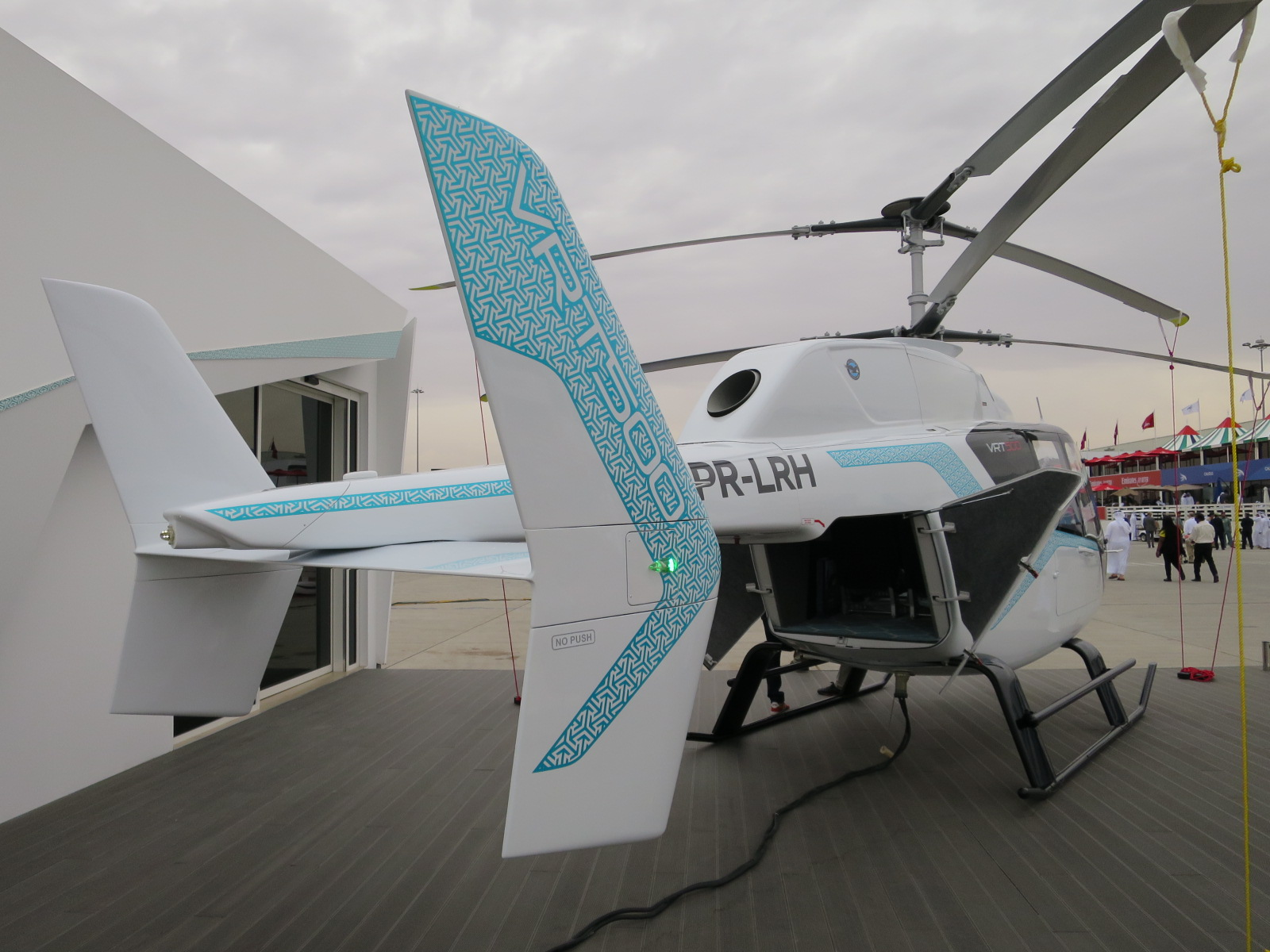
VRT 500 mockup rear view at Dubai Air Show 2019

Source: Aviation International News

- Capacity : six passengers
- Payload : 730 kg (1,610 lb)
- Maximum take-off weight : 1,600 kg (3,527 lb)
- Cruise : 230 km/h (124 kn)
- Max Speed : 250 km/h (130 kn)
- Service ceiling : 6,100 m (20,000 ft)
- Range: 860 km (460 nmi)
- Width: 8.09 m (26.5 ft) over engine pods
- Height: 3.77 m (12.4 ft)

== See also ==
- VRT 300

=== Similar configuration ===
- Kamov Ka-26, coaxial, three blade with twin piston engines with an interchangeable mission cabin
- Kamov Ka-126, single engine development
- Kamov Ka-226 twin engine development

=== Competition ===
- Bell 505
- Robinson R66
