= Lewis Ascender =

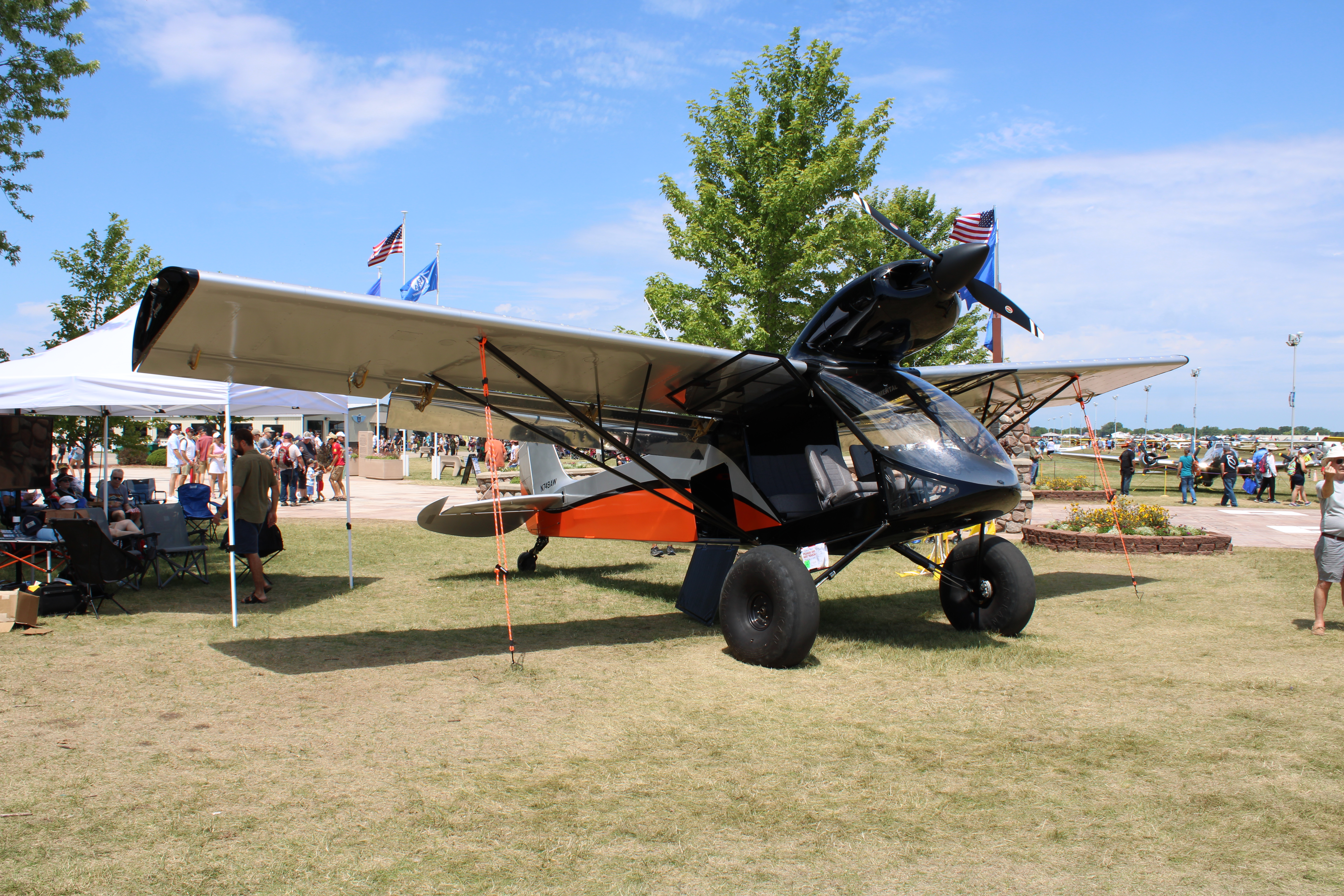
- The Lewis Ascender at EAA AirVenture Oshkosh in 2023

General information
- Type: Homebuilt bush aircraft
- National origin: United States
- Designer: Alec Wild; Eric Lewis; Doug Keller
- Number built: 1

History
- First flight: April 2018
- Developed from: Wild DoubleEnder

The Lewis Ascender is an American homebuilt bush aircraft designed by Alec Wild and Eric Lewis.

== Design and development ==
The Ascender is a single-engined development of the Wild DoubleEnder, which itself is derived from the Piper PA-18 Super Cub. Work on the Ascender began in 2016, with the aircraft being fully designed in CAD. The wings were initially to be taken from the DoubleEnder, but were later entirely redesigned with mechanically actuated double-slotted flaps. The leading-edge slats present on the DoubleEnder were removed on the new Ascender wing to reduce drag. The Ascender's tail, which resembles that of the Super Cub, features a horizontal stabilizer with a symmetrical airfoil and an enlarged vertical stabilizer. The Ascender's landing gear is fitted with 35-inch tires and oversized disc brakes. The fuselage of the Ascender is built with 4130 chromoly steel, while the wings are aluminum. The cockpit features a large bubble canopy and seats two in a side-by-side layout, and a bench seat behind the cockpit seats two additional passengers. The aircraft was initially powered by a single 180 hp (130 kW) Superior Air Parts XP-400 engine mounted above the cockpit, but this was later replaced by a 225 hp (168 kW) Lycoming YIO-390-EXP. Fuel is provided by a pair of 24-gallon tanks located in the wings. A ballistic parachute can be installed as an option.

== Operational history ==
After a construction period of 18 months, the Ascender was first flown in April 2018. Flight testing resulted in modifications to the engine cowling and ailerons. In July 2018, the Ascender's Superior XP-400 engine suffered a crankshaft failure which resulted in the aircraft ditching in a lake in Alaska and sinking. The aircraft was subsequently recovered and, after two years of repairs, flew once again with a new Lycoming engine.

Alec Wild and Eric Lewis have expressed interest in making an Ascender kit aircraft available to the public.

== Specifications ==
Data from

General characteristics

- Capacity: 4
- Length: 23 ft 6 in (7.16 m)
- Wingspan: 37 ft (11 m)
- Height: 10 ft 6 in (3.20 m)
- Empty weight: 1,500 lb (680 kg)
- Gross weight: 2,500 lb (1,134 kg)
- Fuel capacity: 48 US gal (180 L)
- Powerplant: 1 × Lycoming YIO-390-EXP four-cylinder engine, 225 hp (168 kW)
- Propellers: 2-bladed Hartzell propeller

Performance

- Cruise speed: 114 mph (183 km/h, 99 kn)
- Stall speed: 35 mph (56 km/h, 30 kn)
- Never exceed speed: 140 mph (230 km/h, 120 kn)

Avionics

- Garmin G3X

== See also ==
Related development

- Piper PA-18 Super Cub
- Wild DoubleEnder

Aircraft of comparable role, configuration, and era

- Aviat Husky
- Bushcaddy L-164
- CubCrafters CC19 XCub
- Murphy Rebel
- Seabird Seeker
