= Alliant Credit Union =

American online credit union in Illinois

- Type: Credit union
- Industry: Financial
- Founded: October 26, 1935; 90 years ago
- Headquarters: Chicago, Illinois, U.S.
- Key people: Mike Dobbins (CEO)
- Products: Savings, checking, consumer loans, credit cards, investments, online banking
- Total assets: $19.65B USD (2025)
- Members: 913,284 (2025)
- Website: www.alliantcreditunion.org

Alliant Credit Union is an American credit union headquartered in Chicago, Illinois. Founded in 1935, it ranks among the largest credit unions in the United States, serving over 900,000 members across the nation. Alliant operates solely as an online credit union, with all branches having closed as of 2020.

Initially established as the United Airlines Employees' Credit Union (UAECU) by United Airlines employees in 1935, the institution later adopted the name "Alliant Credit Union" in 2003. Over the years, it broadened its membership scope, extending its services to multiple sponsor organizations and communities around O'Hare International Airport.

Alliant is a state-chartered credit union regulated by the Illinois Department of Financial and Professional Regulation (IDFPR), the Consumer Financial Protection Bureau (CFPB), and the National Credit Union Administration (NCUA).
