= Wild DoubleEnder =

DoubleEnder

General information
- Type: Homebuilt aircraft
- National origin: United States
- Designer: Alec Wild
- Number built: 1

History
- First flight: 2010
- Developed from: Piper PA-18
- Developed into: Lewis Ascender

The Wild DoubleEnder is an American twin engine utility aircraft designed for bush flying. It was designed to be the ultimate platform for flying in a remote environment, where safety, performance, and visibility are all extremely crucial.

== Design and development ==
The DoubleEnder is a two place tandem seat conventional landing gear equipped, high winged aircraft. The two engines are mounted in tandem on top of the fuselage in a push-pull configuration. The steel tube fuselage is fabric covered with a plexiglas nose. A 55 U.S. gallons (210 L; 46 imp gal) belly pod can be used to increase fuel capacity to 103 U.S. gallons (390 L; 86 imp gal). A variety of wing configurations and lift devices were used during the development period.

== Specifications (DoubleEnder) ==
Data from EAA

General characteristics

- Crew: one
- Capacity: one passenger
- Empty weight: 1,500 lb (680 kg)
- Gross weight: 2,500 lb (1,134 kg)
- Fuel capacity: 48 U.S. gallons (180 L; 40 imp gal)
- Powerplant: 2 × Rotax 914 horizontally opposed piston aircraft engines, 130 hp (97 kW) each
- Propellers: 3-bladed Warp Drive

Performance

- Cruise speed: 100 kn (115 mph, 185 km/h)
- Stall speed: 31 kn (36 mph, 58 km/h)
- Range: 840 nmi (970 mi, 1,560 km)
- Endurance: 9 hours

== History ==
The DoubleEnder project started in the mid-2000s when designer Alec Wild set out to design a modern bush plane. He started to design the aircraft in 2007 with the help of Doug Keller, and Eric Lewis. They started the design around 2007 and had finished the prototype by 2010. After the prototype was built, the aircraft saw many variants of wings, flaps, ailerons, spoilers, slats, tail surfaces, and more. The team even had plans to design and build multiple variants of the aircraft. The status of the project as a whole remains unclear and the aircraft's last known flight was in 2015.
