= Sérignan-du-Comtat =

Sérignan-du-Comtat Serinhan dau Comtat (Occitan)
- Commune
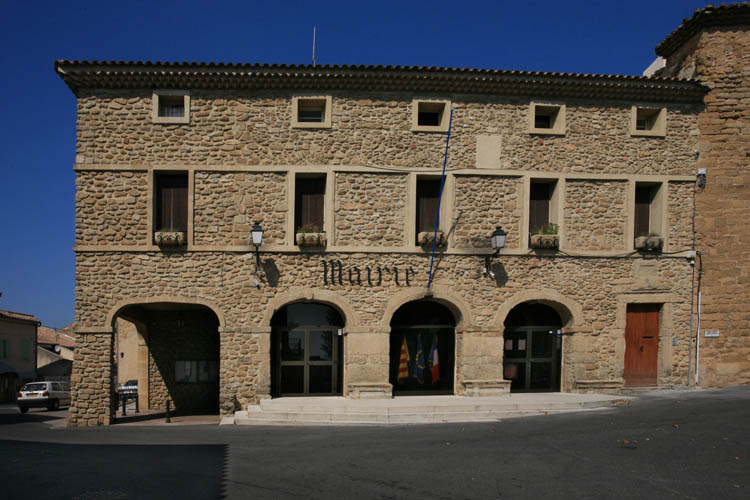
- Sérignan-du-Comtat Town Hall

- Coat of arms
- Location of Sérignan-du-Comtat
- Location within France Location within Provence-Alpes-Côte d'Azur
- Coordinates: 44°11′24″N 4°50′39″E
- Country: France
- Region: Provence-Alpes-Côte d'Azur
- Department: Vaucluse
- Arrondissement: Carpentras
- Canton: Bollène
- Intercommunality: CC Aygues Ouvèze en Provence

Government
  - Mayor (2020–2026): Julien Merle
- Area^{1}: 19.82 km^{2} (7.65 sq mi)
- Elevation: 80 m (260 ft)
- Highest elevation: 240 m (790 ft)
- Lowest elevation: 53 m (174 ft)
- Population (2023): 2,939
  - Density: 148.3/km^{2} (384.1/sq mi)
- Demonym: Sérignanais
- Time zone: UTC+01:00 (CET)
  - Summer (DST): UTC+02:00 (CEST)
- INSEE/Postal code: 84127 /84830
- Website: serignanducomtat.fr
- ^{1} French Land Register data, which excludes lakes, ponds, glaciers > 1 km^{2} (0.386 sq mi or 247 acres) and river estuaries.

Sérignan-du-Comtat (French pronunciation: [seʁiɲɑ̃ dy kɔ̃ta]; Occitan: Serinhan dau Comtat) is a commune in the Vaucluse department in the Provence-Alpes-Côte d'Azur region in Southeastern France. Until 1944, it was known simply as Sérignan.

On 1 January 2017, together with a number of neighbouring communes, it was transferred from the arrondissement of Avignon to the arrondissement of Carpentras.

The entomologist Jean-Henri Fabre (1823–1915) died in Sérignan-du-Comtat.

== Demographics ==
Historical population
Year	Pop.	±% p.a.
1968	1,194	—
1975	1,488	+3.19%
1982	1,975	+4.13%
1990	2,069	+0.58%
1999	2,254	+0.96%
2007	2,414	+0.86%
2012	2,448	+0.28%
2017	2,676	+1.80%
2023	2,939	+1.57%
Source: INSEE

== Points of interest ==
- Harmas de Fabre
- Musée-Atelier Werner Lichtner-Aix

== Twin Towns ==
Sérignan-du-Comtat is twinned with:

- Ferentillo, Italy

== See also ==
- Communes of the Vaucluse department
