= Time between overhauls =

Aspect of maintenance

Time between overhauls (abbreviated as TBO or TBOH) is the manufacturer's recommended number of running hours or calendar time before an aircraft engine or other component requires overhaul.

On rotorcraft, many components have recommended or mandatory TBOs, including main rotor blades, tail rotor blades and gearboxes.

For engines, the time between overhauls is generally a function of the complexity of the engine and how it is used. Piston-based engines are much more complex than turbine-powered engines, and generally have TBOs on the order of 1,200 to 2,000 hours of running time. They tend toward the lower number if they are new designs, or include boosting options such as a turbocharger. In comparison, jet engines and turboprops have TBOs from 3,000 hours up to 16,000 hours or more.

Since overhauling requires that the engine be disassembled, parts inspected and measured, and many parts replaced, it is typically a labour-intensive and hence expensive operation. The value of a used engine decreases as hours increase since its last overhaul, so sellers of used engines (and aircraft) typically list the engine's time since major overhaul (SMOH) when advertising the engine (or the aircraft it is fitted in) for sale.

The TBO is a time "recommended" by the manufacturer, and depending upon what rules the aircraft operates under, overhauling the engine at this time is not necessarily mandatory. Depending on the country of registration, aircraft in non-commercial use overhauls may not be mandatory; overhauls at the scheduled times are nevertheless highly recommended for reliability and safety. Likewise, overhaul at the TBO does not guarantee that the engine will last that long.
