= Powered parachute =

Parachute with motor and wheels

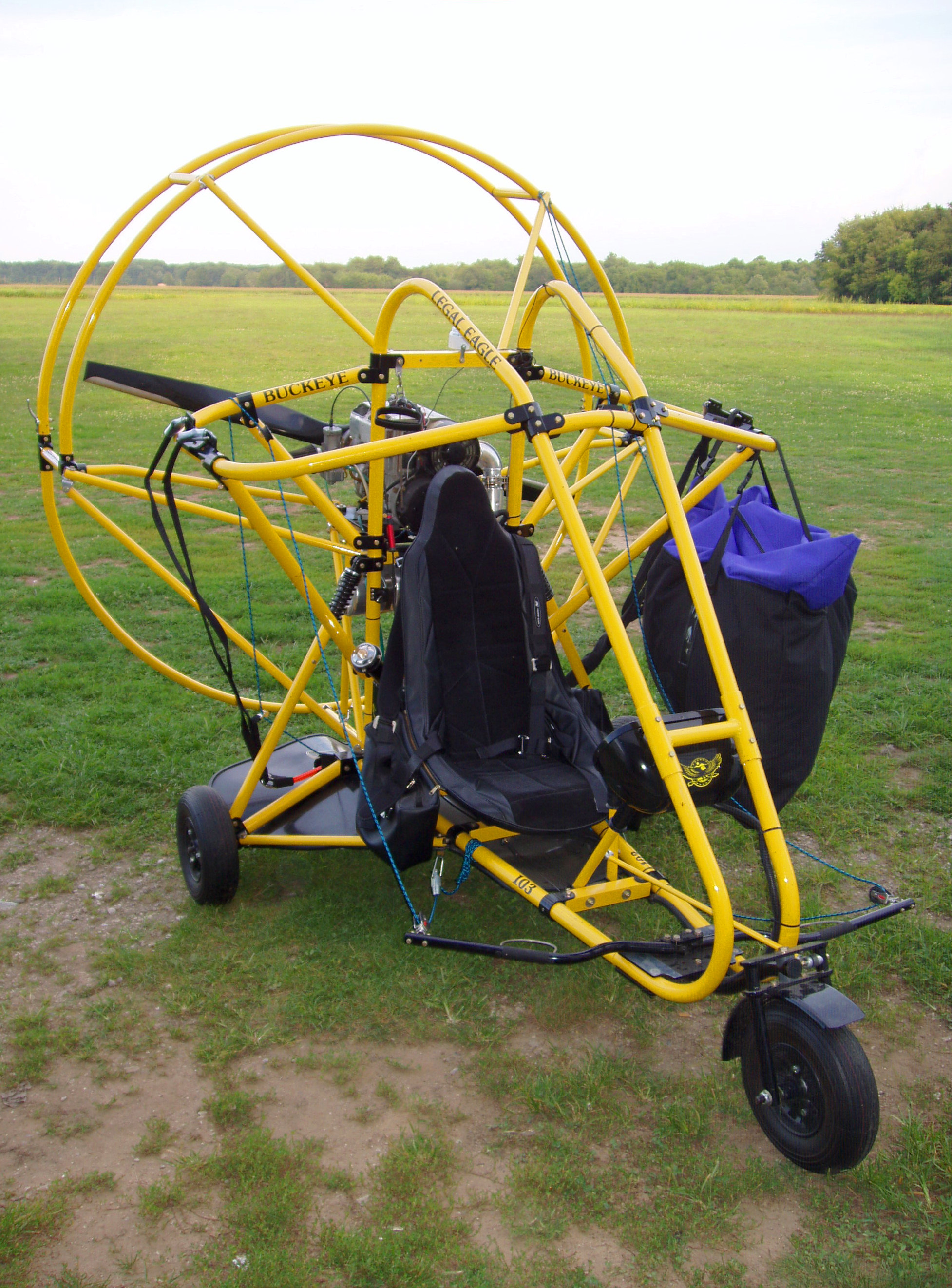
An ultralight version (14 C.F.R. § 103) of a powered parachute (PPC) with its wing stowed.

A powered parachute, often abbreviated PPC, and also called a motorized parachute or paraplane, is a type of aircraft that consists of a parafoil with a motor and wheels.

The FAA defines a powered parachute as a powered aircraft comprised of a flexible or semi-rigid wing connected to a fuselage so that the wing is not in position for flight until the aircraft is in motion. The fuselage of a powered parachute contains the aircraft engine, a seat for each occupant and is attached to the aircraft's landing gear.

While in flight, and due to the design of the parafoil, PPCs effectively travel at a fixed airspeed, typically about 25–35 mph (40–56 km/h). PPCs operate safely at heights ranging from a few feet off the ground (e.g., skimming, fly-bys) to altitudes as high as 10,000+ ft (3+ km), but typical operating heights are between 500 and 1,500 feet (150 and 460 meters) above ground level (AGL). Equipped with a 5-15 gallon fuel tank (depending on the engine and weight limitations), PPCs can typically be flown for about three hours before requiring refueling. They have very short take-off and landing rolls, sometimes less than 100 ft (30 m).

PPCs are among the least expensive aerial vehicles, and are considered a cost-effective way to become an aviator. A new single-seat PPC may cost as little as $10,000, while a two-seat PPC starts around $20,000. Top end two-seat PPCs may cost $35,000 or more, depending on options. The empty weight of a PPC can range from 200–500 lb (91–227 kg) and payload can be upwards of 500 pounds (230 kg).

In the United States, many of the smallest single-seat PPCs are flown under 14 C.F.R. § 103 of the Federal Aviation Regulations and are classified as ultralight aircraft, which allows them to be flown without a license or flight instruction. Flight instruction is, however, highly recommended, and an average student can learn to fly a PPC safely with 5 to 10 hours of flight instruction. Two-seat PPCs are classified as light sport aircraft in the United States, which means the pilot must have at least a sport pilot certificate issued by the FAA to fly them. A minimum of 12 hours of flight instruction, including 2 hours of solo as a student pilot, are required to obtain this certificate. Powered parachuting is not to be confused with powered paragliding.

== Confusion with powered paragliding ==
There is often confusion about the differences between powered parachutes (PPC) and powered paragliders (PPG), both terminologically and even sometimes visually, particularly in flight.

In simple terms, PPCs are often controlled using steering bars pushed on by the feet to operate the steering controls, although there are exceptions such as the Australian Aerochute and the German Xcitor. The airframe is an integral component of the aircraft (as established by FAA regulations).

PPGs, on the other hand, almost exclusively steer using the hands to pull on the steering lines. When paragliding, an airframe is considered purely a higher end option; in fact, since a PPG wing is always to be attached to the harness, if the airframe used in a PPG failed in any way, the wing would continue to support the weight of the occupants and motor through the harness. In addition, because PPGs use smaller low-power engines to stay within 14 C.F.R. § 103 regulations, they frequently use a higher performance parafoil that visually appears thinner and more elliptical to compensate.

Any other distinctions are less clear. In the United States, all paragliding equipment must fall within 14 C.F.R. § 103, and pilot licensing (in the strict legal sense) is not applicable, which is not much different from ultralight PPCs. Other lines are blurred further. For example, some people previously argued that two-seat flying is only allowed using a PPC, but "tandem" (two-seat) paragliding is readily doable in many countries throughout the world, and limited types of tandem paragliding are legally authorized in the U.S. as a result of an FAA exemption for flight training only (since 2018, with subsequent extensions).

Another contributing reason for confusion nowadays comes from the fact that some aircraft and kit builders market ultralight-class rolling airframes that can be configured with either PPG-style hand steering or PPC-style foot steering (along with wider canopy attachment points), with the later sold as a 14 C.F.R. § 103 'powered parachute'. The net result is nearly identical aircraft, albeit with different steering systems and potentially different canopy types.

== Safety ==
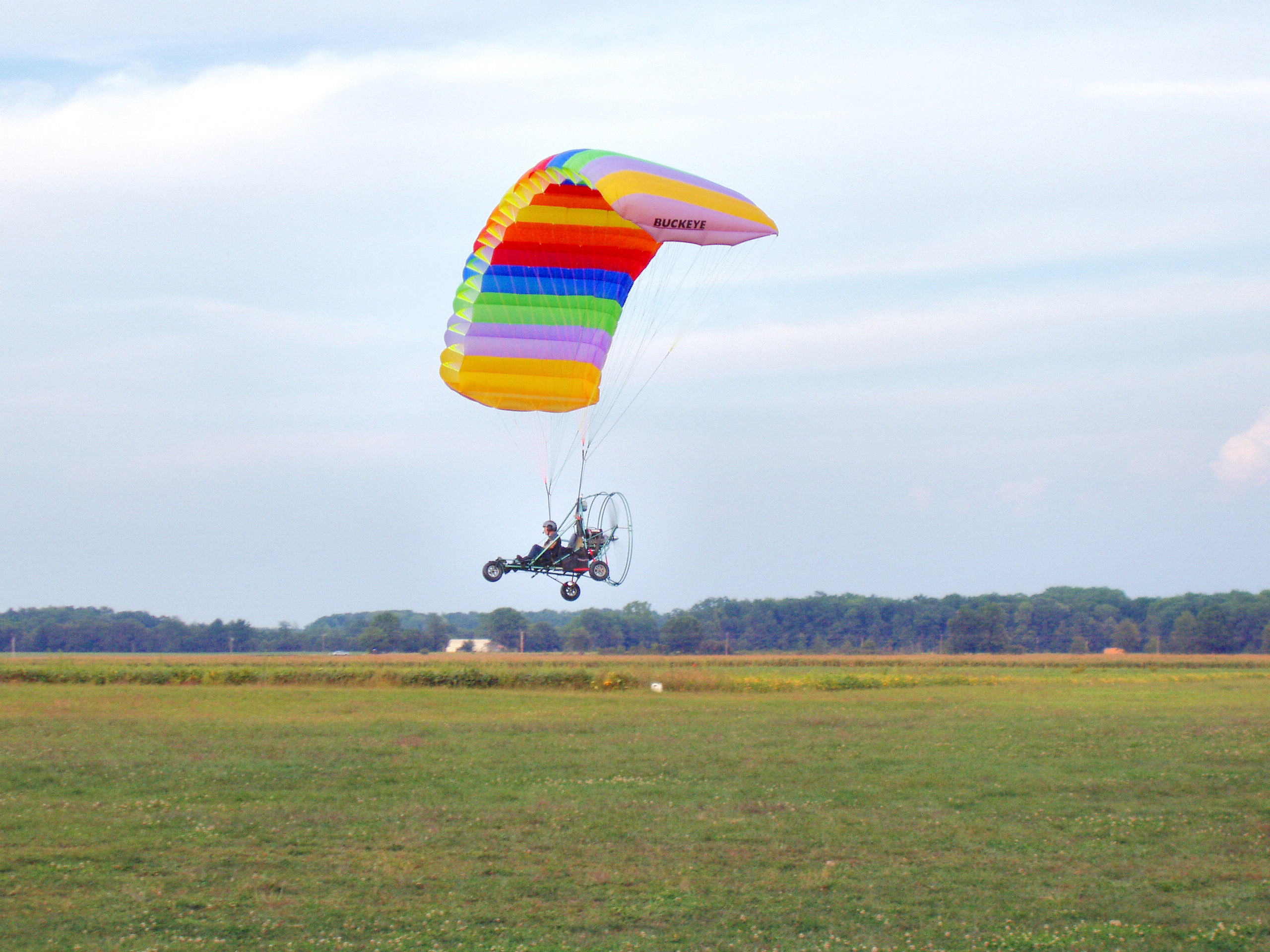
Side view in flight.

PPCs are considered by some to be safer than normal fixed-wing aircraft because of their inherent stability, limited response to control inputs, and stall resistance. There are two primary means to control a PPC: increasing or decreasing engine power (which controls the vertical rate of climb) and deflecting the right or left trailing edge of the parafoil—by moving the steering bars with the feet—which turns the aircraft right or left.

Flaring is generally used to make fine adjustments in altitude when flying close to the ground and, in particular, when landing. In a powered parachute, flaring refers to pushing on both of the steering bars simultaneously, which causes the left and right trailing edges of the canopy to be pulled downwards at the same time. The result of this is that the airframe moves forward of the wing (on the transverse axis), airspeed is reduced, the angle of attack increases, and the aircraft temporarily gains additional lift. Done properly, the primary benefit of this maneuver is that it softens a landing (and especially an engine-out landing) within the last few feet off the ground.

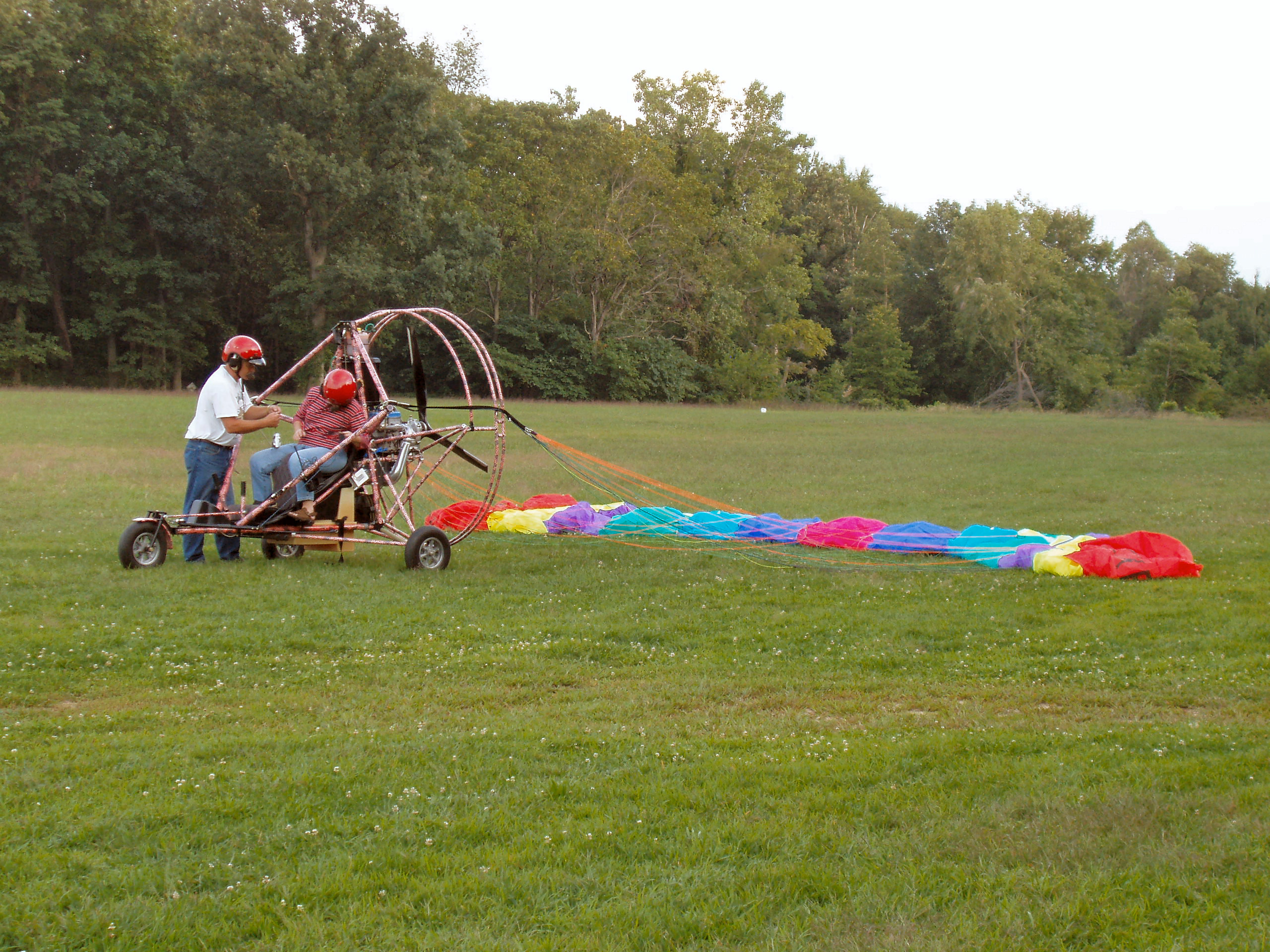
A powered parachute with its wing laid out in preparation for takeoff.

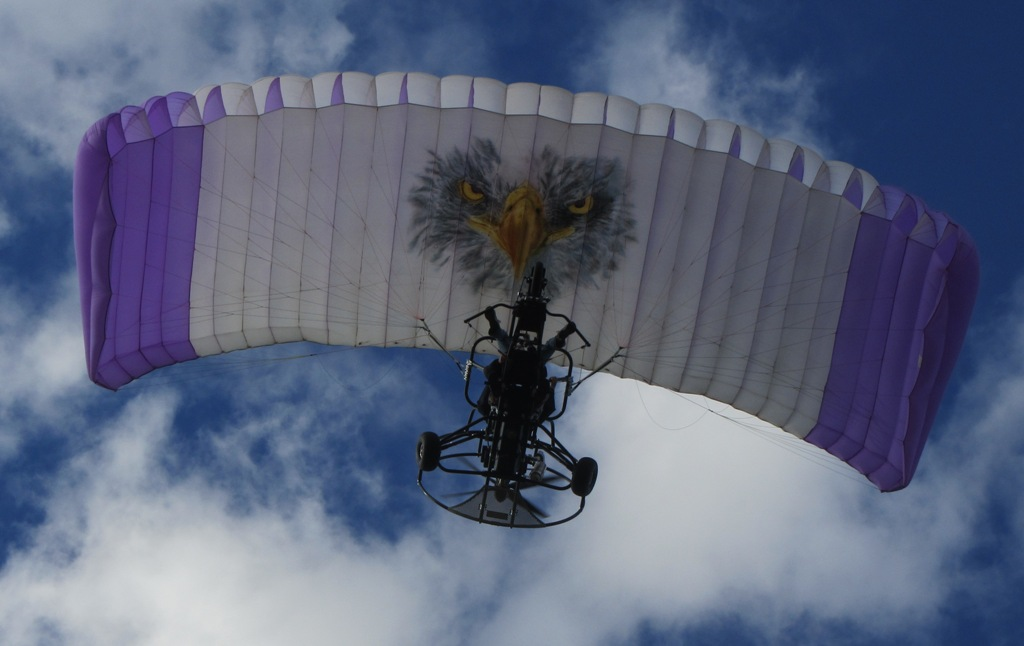
Two-person powered parachute trike

The power-off glide ratio of a PPC ranges from 3:1 to 6:1. Glide ratio varies depending on the chute size and shape. Engine-off landings are generally safe, provided that the aircraft is within glide range of a suitable landing zone and the pilot is properly trained in the use of proper flaring technique.

Although possible, it is difficult to cause the aircraft to get into a dangerous attitude, stall, or chute collapse by means of pilot control inputs. Chute collapse is considered by many pilots to be virtually impossible with square wings. The wing is more likely to collapse with the more maneuverable, but inherently less stable, elliptical wing, but such collapses are normally followed by an immediate reflation and often go unnoticed by the pilot. In the rare circumstances where an elliptical wing collapses, the collapse is caused either by some extreme adverse meteorological condition or by pilot error. The FAA reports that over 80 percent of all aviation accidents are due to pilot error. Inflatable ram-air elliptical wings can have upward of 30 individual cells whereas square wings typically have fewer than 13 cells.

The main hazards one faces while flying a PPC are associated with wind and obstacles. Flight should not be attempted in winds exceeding 10–15 mph or in gusty conditions. Wind hazards include terrain-induced air disturbances called rotors (it is advisable to stay upwind of trees, mountains, and other obstacles that disturb the flow of the wind). Wake turbulence created by the passage of other aircraft (referred to as "wingtip vortices"), especially aircraft that are heavy, aerodynamically "dirty", and slow, pose another significant hazard. Also, since the slow-moving PPC, like a helicopter, is particularly well equipped to fly safely near the ground, special care must be taken to avoid power lines, trees, and other low-level terrain obstacles.

== Operations ==
PPC pilots typically enjoy flying low and slow, and the PPC is an excellent platform for sightseeing and photography. PPCs are also used in agriculture, and occasionally by law enforcement agencies and flight search organizations.

PPCs do not need an airport to take off and land. Many pilots choose and prefer to fly from back yard strips, small airports, and mowed hay fields.

In the United States, Part 103 ultralight PPCs (like other classes of ultralight aircraft) are not allowed to fly at night, and not over densely populated areas. However, the FAA implemented the sport pilot rule in 2004, which expanded the areas over and airspace in which light sport aircraft (LSA) PPCs can legally fly. In fact, a properly equipped PPC may even be flown at night or over metropolitan areas by a private pilot with a PPC rating.

== Uses ==
=== Law enforcement ===
Powered parachutes have operated in an observation platform role by police departments, and have assisted with suspect captures, river rescues, critical infrastructure over-flights, crime scene photos, narcotics enforcement and crime suppression, at a small fraction of the cost of a police helicopter. In one case, this low-cost aviation asset was procured from the U.S. Department of Justice, Aviation Technology Program.

=== Emergency medical services ===
The I-Fly Maverick was a street-legal experimental certified aircraft designed to provide emergency medical services to the Huaorani indigenous people in the Amazon rainforest in Ecuador.

=== Hunting and scouting ===
It is generally illegal in the U.S. to actually hunt/shoot from any aircraft, except in very limited certain circumstances. However, a PPC is considered an ideal aircraft for initially scouting animal and herd locations in the days or weeks prior to a hunting season, due to its naturally slower flight characteristics. During hunting season, most U.S. states have strict rules about mandatory waiting periods between the time a hunter uses an aircraft and can actually hunt, and virtually all have restrictions and serious penalties for the use of any aircraft to hunt in real-time (e.g., air-to-ground collaboration/communications). With outright bans by many states disallowing UAV use in any situation related to hunting and wildlife harassment, PPCs are considered by some to be a more animal-friendly and cost-effective alternative.

== History ==
In 1930, a cover article in Modern Mechanix, October issue, described the project of Buddy Bushmeyer for a powered parachute. the concept of a "powered parachute" was born, and is a contributing reason why the sport is called powered parachuting, despite the fact that it actually uses a parafoil.

After World War II, sport jumping became a recreational activity, and started with the round parachutes available at that time, ranging in size from 20 to 30 feet in diameter.

On October 1, 1964, Domina Jalbert applied for a patent for his new "Multi-Cell Wing" he named a "parafoil" (also known as a "ram-air" wing), which was a new parachute design. His ideas were registered as U.S. patent 3,285,546 on November 15, 1966.

The possibilities of Jalbert's design quickly became apparent: because the parafoil formed a wing shape upon inflation, increased glide ratios were possible and the distance traveled could likely be extended, assuming the person or payload suspended under the chute had some thrust added. With even more power, the angle of attack could be shifted, and the wing could fly level or even climb.

In 1968, Lowell Farrand attempted just this, and flew a motorized version called the “Irish Flyer I”, developed by Dr. John Nicolaides at Notre Dame University. It was a modified standard Bensen gyrocopter, with the rotor removed and replaced by a 6-foot cross-member to which the parafoil was attached. The propeller was shrouded in order to avoid entanglement with the parafoil lines. Irish Flyer I was tested in the summer of 1968 by towing it aloft and releasing it for extended powered glides. Over the proceeding years, additional tow-based prototypes were developed and flown.

Unfortunately, heavy engines, as well as limitations in the availability of strong and light parafoil and frame materials, contributed to making the concept difficult to execute.

The later development of the first mass-produced powered parachute took approximately two and one-half years.

Aeronautical engineer Steve Snyder was implementing and perfecting the use of the square ram-air parafoils, and decided to pursue the idea and objective of creating a safe and simple aircraft that even amateurs could launch and fly easily.

The first powered parachute that could take off under its own power flew in 1981 when Steve Snyder, Dan Thompson, and Adrian Vandenburg combined their talents and inspiration. It was Snyder's idea to take skydiving's newest parafoil designs and add newer (and lighter) engines, while Vandenburg's skills as a machinist were critical to building the cockpit frame that was completed in March 1981. Daniel Thompson, an ultralight-aircraft designer and small-engine mechanic, was brought onto the project three months later to identify a power plant for the aircraft. He fitted the aircraft with two small Chrysler engines, resulting in the first prototype P-1 aircraft.

On the first day of test flight, attempts were made to simply get the PPC off the ground. Snyder, at 150 lbs., finally tried easing the power away from full throttle at take-off, and managed to fly the craft to a height of 40 to 50 feet. Snyder had a difficult time controlling the aircraft because of the torque produced by both engines' propellers spinning in the same direction. The total flight time was 30–35 seconds at a speed of 20 to 25 mph. The P-1 flew more than 10 times, once by a woman weighing 110 lbs., which allowed for better performance of the test flights. Many revisions were made during those test flights, including the addition of a vertical stabilizer, flaps, ailerons, and optimization of the parafoil trim.

Ram air parafoils of the day had a flat profile and offered limited control. As a result, a more anhedral (downward curve) design was applied and ribs were added to the parafoil, ultimately giving the aircraft more stability and pressurization and solving the control issue.

As the parafoil design and control solutions were being worked out, Thompson developed an improved airframe design, including Snyder's idea of folding landing gear for portability. The problem of torque was resolved by having the propellers counter-rotating, thus canceling out each other's torque effect. The P-2 aircraft was completed in January 1983.

Design and construction of the P-3 started on February 26, 1983. Three months later the prototype made its debut at the Sun & Fun Airshow in Florida. Response was overwhelming, and the ParaPlane Corporation was formed to produce the first commercially viable P-3 powered parachute. Since that time, many innovations and improvements have developed.

== Model engineering ==
There are also radio-controlled models of powered parachutes.

== See also ==
- Foil kite
- Hang glider
- Parawing
- Powered paraglider – a foot launched powered paramotor.
- Powered hang glider – a foot launched hang glider.
- Ultralight trike
- Ultralight aviation

=== People ===
- Domina Jalbert
- Francis Rogallo
