= 3203 =

3203 may refer to:

- 3203 Huth asteroid
- Hirth 3203 two stroke aircraft engine
- The year in the 33rd century
