= Hirth 3202 =

German two-stroke aircraft engine

Hirth 3202 & 3203
- Type: Twin cylinder two-stroke aircraft engine
- National origin: Germany
- Manufacturer: Hirth
- Manufactured: May 2002 - present

The Hirth 3202 and 3203 are a family of in-line twin cylinder, two stroke, carburetted aircraft engines, with optional fuel injection, designed for use on ultralight aircraft, especially two seat ultralight trainers, gyrocopters and small homebuilts. It is manufactured by Hirth of Germany.

== Development ==
The 3203 was developed as a replacement for the Hirth 2706 and as a competitor to the 64 hp (48 kW) Rotax 582. It replaced the 2706 in the Hirth line in May 2002. The engine is similar to the Rotax powerplant in being a two-cylinder in-line engine, with dual capacitor discharge ignition, although it is air-cooled, compared to the 582's liquid cooling. The 3202 was developed from the 3203 as a de-rated version to replace the Hirth 2704 and compete with the 50 hp (37 kW) Rotax 503. Both engines have the same bore, stroke, displacement, compression ratio, and weight as the Hirth engines they replace.

Both the 3202 and 3203 use free air or fan cooling, with dual Bing 34 mm slide carburetors or optionally fuel injection. The cylinder walls are electrochemically coated with Nikasil. Standard starting is a recoil start with electric start as an option. The reduction drive system available is the G-50 gearbox, with reduction ratios of 2.16:1, 2.29:1, 2.59:1, 3.16:1, or 3.65:1, with a cog-belt reduction drive optional.

The engines run on a 50:1 pre-mix of unleaded 93 octane auto fuel and oil, or optionally oil injection.

== Variants ==
3202
Twin-cylinder in-line, two stroke, aircraft engine with a dual Bing 34mm slide carburetors or fuel injection. Produces 55 hp (41 kW) at 5500 rpm and has a factory rated TBO of 1200 hours. In production. Replaced the 2704 in production in May 2002.
3203
Twin-cylinder in-line, two stroke, aircraft engine with dual Bing 34mm slide carburetors or fuel injection. Produces 65 hp (48 kW) at 6300 rpm and has a factory rated TBO of 1000 hours. In production. Replaced the 2706 in production in May 2002.

== Applications ==
3202

- Aero Adventure Aventura
- Lockwood Drifter
- Excalibur Aircraft Excalibur
- Flightstar
- ISON Airbike
- Kolb Firestar II
- Paladin Sparrow
- Quad City Challenger II
- Trio-Twister 203

3203

- CGS Hawk
- Excalibur Aircraft Excalibur
- Fisher Classic
- Kolb Firestar
- Kolb Mark III
- Para-Ski Top Gun
- Quad City Challenger II
- Rans S-12 Airaile
- ASAP Beaver RX550
- Raj Hamsa X-Air
- Revolution Mini 500
- Rotortec Cloud Dancer I
- US Light Aircraft Hornet

== Specifications (3203) ==
Data from Recreational Power Engineering

=== General characteristics ===
- Type: Twin cylinder, two-stroke, in-line, aircraft engine
- Bore: 76 mm (3.0 in)
- Stroke: 69 mm (2.7 in)
- Displacement: 625 cc (38.1 cu in)
- Length: 377 mm (14.8 in)
- Width: 587 mm (23.1 in)
- Height: 383 mm (15.1 in)
- Dry weight: 73 lb (33.1 kg)with free air cooling, 79 lb (35.8 kg) with fan cooling, including electric starter and exhaust. G-50 gearbox adds an additional 19 lb (8.6 kg)

=== Components ===
- Fuel system: 2 X Bing 34mm slide type carburetors or fuel injection
- Fuel type: unleaded 93 octane auto fuel
- Oil system: 50:1 fuel/oil premix or oil injection
- Cooling system: free air or fan
- Reduction gear: G-50 gearbox with reduction ratios of 2.16:1, 2.29:1, 2.59:1, 3.16:1, or 3.65:1 or cog-belt

=== Performance ===
- Power output: 65 hp (48 kW) at 5500 rpm
- Compression ratio: 9.5:1

== See also ==
- Arrow 500
