= Excalibur Aircraft Excalibur =

American ultralight airplane

Excalibur
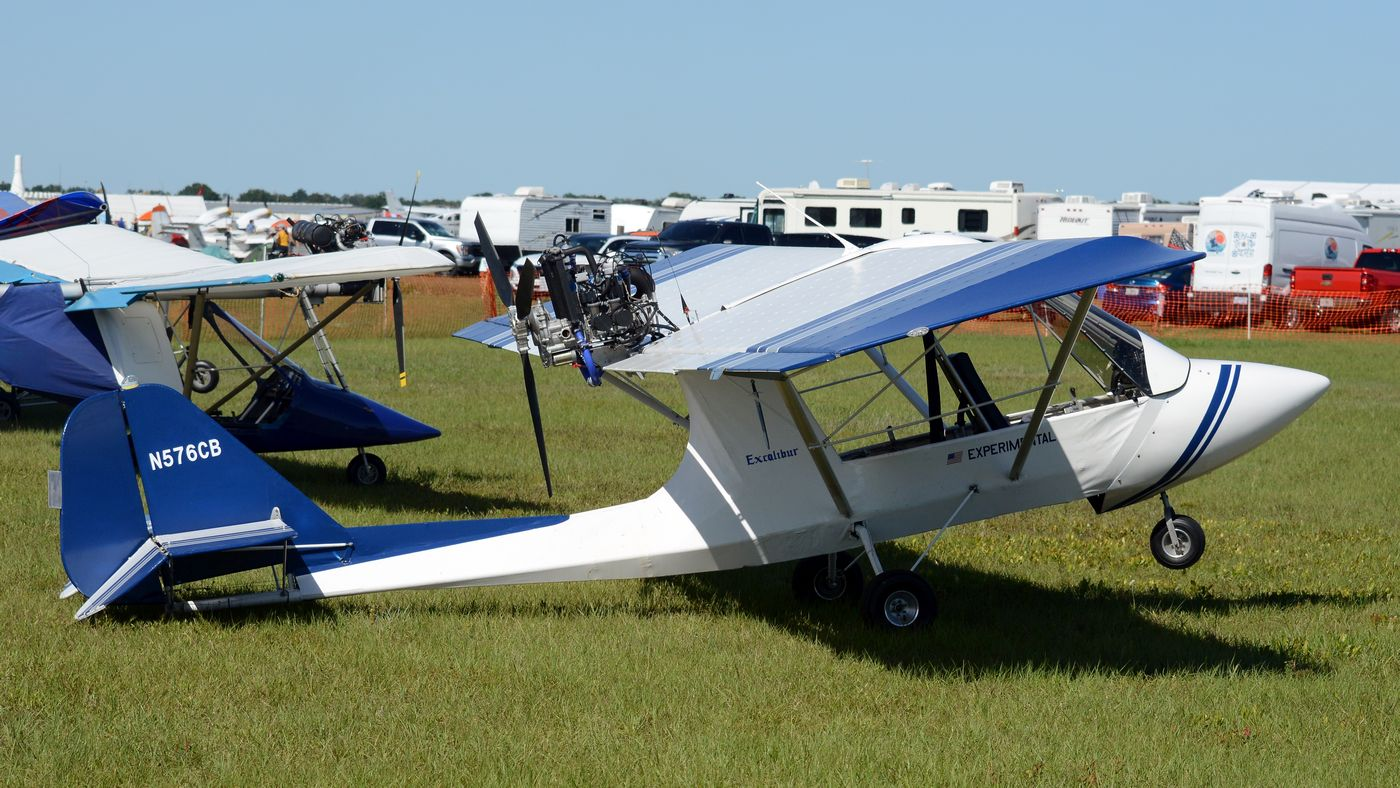

General information
- Type: Ultralight aircraft
- National origin: United States
- Manufacturer: Excalibur Aircraft

History
- Manufactured: 1900 (by 2011)
- Introduction date: 1993

The Excalibur is an American two seats-in-tandem, high wing, pusher configuration ultralight aircraft that is manufactured in kit form for amateur construction, by Excalibur Aircraft of Sebring, Florida. It was introduced in 1993.

The Excalibur is available in the US amateur-built and light-sport aircraft categories and in Canada in the amateur-built, BULA and AULA categories. In Europe it qualifies under the Fédération Aéronautique Internationale microlight rules.

== Design and development ==
The Excalibur was designed as "clone" of the Quad City Challenger II aircraft. The company took the basic Challenger design and incorporated many changes, including mounting the engine upright allowing larger propellers and the Rotax gearbox to be mounted, lengthening the tailboom and enlarging the tail vertical surface to increase stability, shortening the ailerons and replacing control cables with torque tubes. The optional Dacron covering on the Challenger was replaced with Superflite standard aircraft fabric, the fuselage was lengthened to give more backseat room and the nosecone was reduced in size to provide better over-the-nose visibility. The design was also streamlined to reduce drag and round cross-section wing struts were replaced with aerodynamic extrusions. The Challenger's rigid landing gear was replaced with a bungee-suspended system.

Regarding the landing gear improvements reviewer Andre Cliche, author of the Ultralight Aircraft Shopper's Guide, said:

the Excalibur features a bungee suspension on mainwheels. That's an improvement over the Challenger whose rigid main gear tubes kinked too many times during rough landings. A suspension on mainwheels will certainly be appreciated by instructors who leave their machines in the hands of novice pilots.

== Variants ==
Excalibur
Basic model with 50 hp (37 kW) Rotax 503, 64 hp (48 kW) Rotax 582, 70 hp (52 kW) Hirth 3503, 65 hp (48 kW) Hirth 3203 or the 55 hp (41 kW) Hirth 3202 two-stroke engines. 750 completed and flown by the end of 2011.
Excalibur Four Stroke
Model with HKS 700E 60 hp (45 kW) or 80 hp (60 kW) Jabiru 2200 80 hp (60 kW) four-stroke engines. 400 completed and flown by the end of 2011.
Excalibur Wide Body (Stretch)
Model with wider fuselage, also called the Excalibur Stretch. 750 completed and flown by the end of 2011.

== Specifications (Excalibur) ==
Data from Kitplanes and Excalibur

General characteristics

- Crew: one
- Capacity: one passenger
- Length: 20 ft 0 in (6.10 m)
- Wingspan: 31 ft 6 in (9.60 m)
- Height: 6 ft 0 in (1.83 m)
- Wing area: 185 sq ft (17.2 m^{2})
- Empty weight: 450 lb (204 kg)
- Gross weight: 950 lb (431 kg)
- Fuel capacity: 10 US gal (38 litres)
- Powerplant: 1 × Rotax 503 twin cylinder, two-stroke aircraft engine, 50 hp (37 kW)

Performance

- Cruise speed: 80 mph (130 km/h, 70 kn)
- Stall speed: 33 mph (53 km/h, 29 kn)
- Range: 290 mi (470 km, 250 nmi)
- g limits: +6/-4 (ultimate load limits)
- Rate of climb: 1,200 ft/min (6.1 m/s)

Avionics

- none

== See also ==
Related development

- Quad City Challenger

Aircraft of comparable role, configuration, and era

- Earthstar Thunder Gull
- Titan Tornado
- US Light Aircraft Hornet
