= CGS Aviation =

American aircraft manufacturer

CGS Aviation, Inc.
- Company type: Privately held company
- Industry: Aerospace
- Founded: early 1970s
- Founder: Chuck Slusarczyk
- Headquarters: Grand Bay, Alabama, United States
- Key people: CEO: Danny Dezauche
- Products: Ultralight aircraft

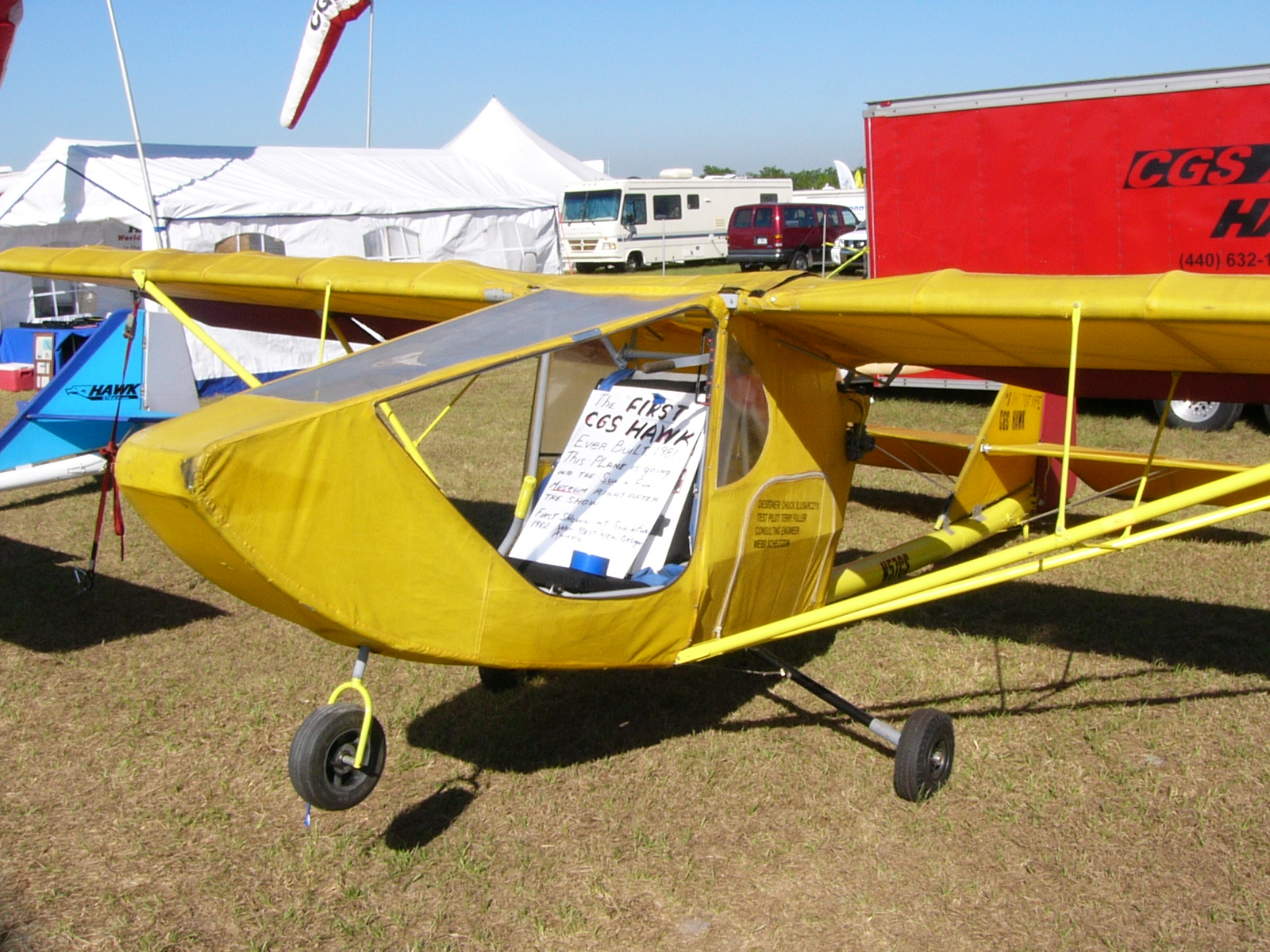
The original CGS Hawk prototype at Sun 'n Fun in 2006. The plane was brought to the show and flown for the first time in 24 years, after which it was donated to the Florida Air Museum.

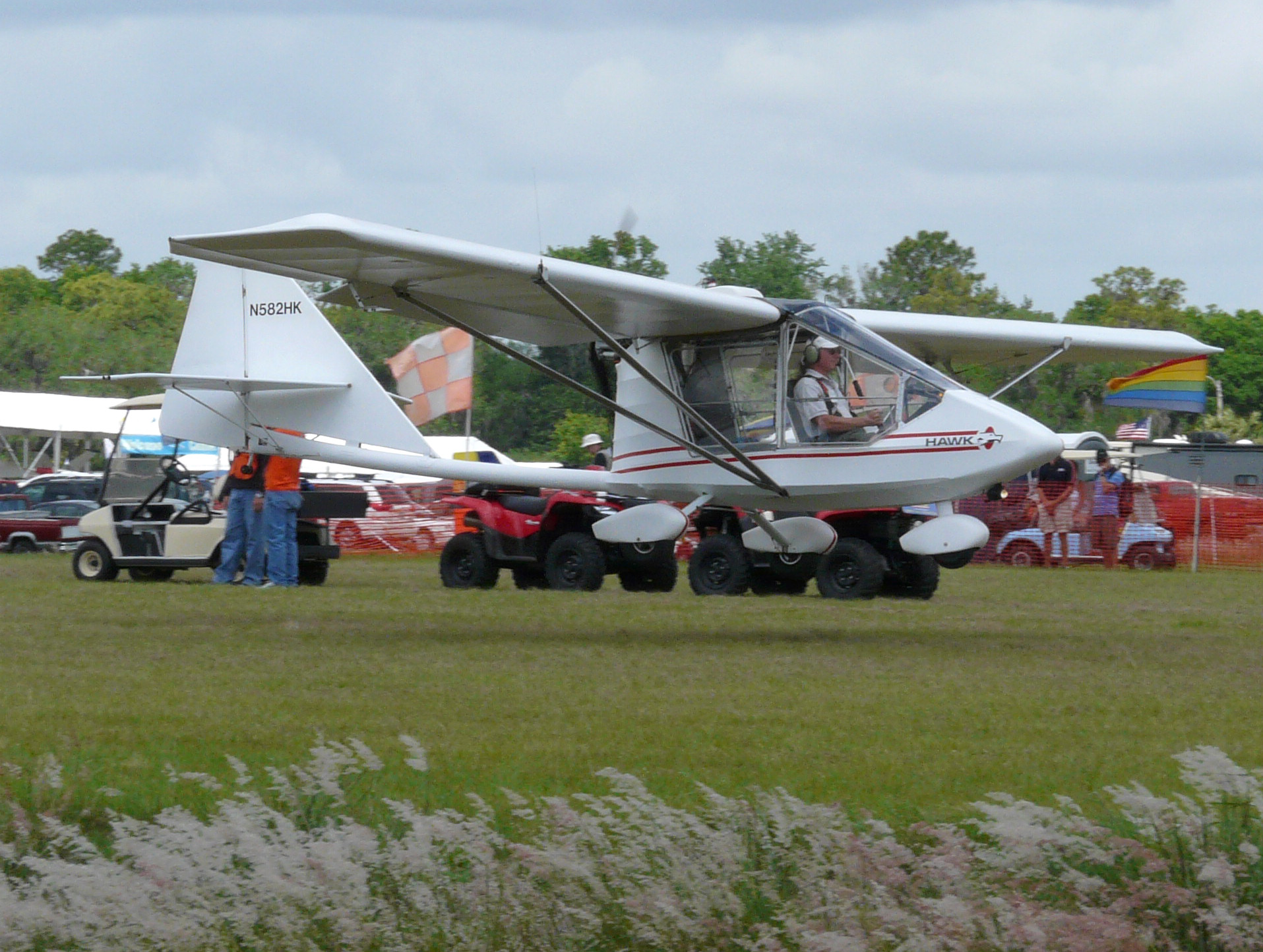
A CGS Hawk Arrow II at Sun 'n Fun.

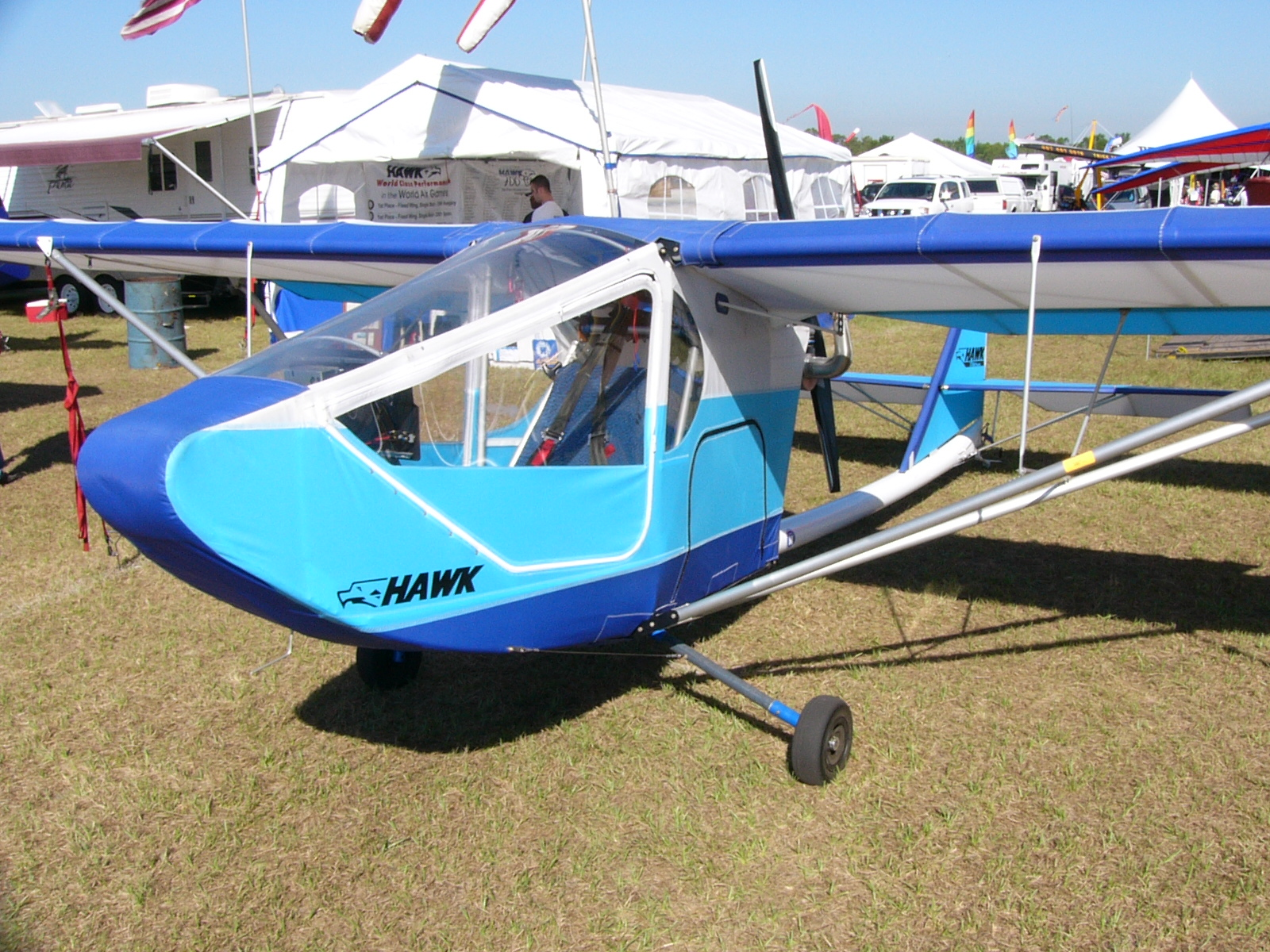
A CGS Hawk Ultra, a legal US FAR Part 103 ultralight vehicle, at Sun 'n Fun, 2006

CGS Aviation, Inc. is an American aircraft manufacturer based in Grand Bay, Alabama. The company was founded by Chuck Slusarczyk in the early 1970s in Broadview Heights, Ohio as Chuck's Glider Supplies. Today it is run by Danny Dezauche and specializes in the design and manufacture of ultralight aircraft in the form of kits for amateur construction and ready-to-fly aircraft in the US FAR 103 Ultralight Vehicles rules category.

== History ==
The company started in the early 1970s as a hang glider manufacturer and aircraft parts supplier under the name Chucks' Glider Supplies. Founder Chuck Slusarczyk later carried out experiments with powered hang gliders and developed a reduction drive system to turn larger propellers more slowly to reduce noise and improve efficiency. He was granted a US patent for his system.

In October 1979 the company was renamed CGS Aviation, Inc.

In 1980 development of the CGS Hawk aircraft series was begun, starting with a survey of pilot expectations and desires for a new ultralight aircraft design.

== Products ==
The Hawk line of ultralight aircraft was introduced at Sun 'n Fun, Lakeland, Florida, in March, 1982. The Hawk was the first fully enclosed ultralight, the first with fully strut-braced wings, three-axis controls, a steerable nose or tail wheel and wing flaps. The original 1982 CGS Hawk Classic remains in production in 2015.

The Hawk series includes the single seat Hawk Arrow, Hawk Plus, Hawk Sport, Hawk Ultra and AG-Hawk. Two seat models include the Hawk Classic II and the Hawk Arrow II. More than 1700 Hawks series aircraft have been flown.

The Hawk prototype was named Best New Design for 1982 at Sun 'n Fun in March 1982. At the EAA Convention in Oshkosh, Wisconsin that same year the Hawk was named Outstanding New Design and also Reserve Grand Champion. At Oshkosh 1983, the Hawk won the Dupont Kevlar Air Recreational Vehicle Design Competition against more than 126 other aircraft designs in the competition.

== Aircraft ==
Summary of aircraft built by CGS Aviation
Model name	First flight	Number built	Type
CGS Hawk Classic	1982	990 (2011)	Ultralight aircraft
CGS Hawk Arrow		135 (2011)	Ultralight aircraft
CGS Hawk Plus		65 (2001)	Ultralight aircraft
CGS Hawk Sport		8 (2001)	Ultralight aircraft
CGS Hawk Ultra		8 (2001)	Ultralight aircraft
CGS AG-Hawk		30 (1998)	Ultralight agricultural aircraft
CGS Hawk Classic II		290 (1998)	Two seat ultralight aircraft
CGS Hawk Arrow II		186 (2011)	Two seat ultralight aircraft
