= Titan Tornado =

American kit aircraft

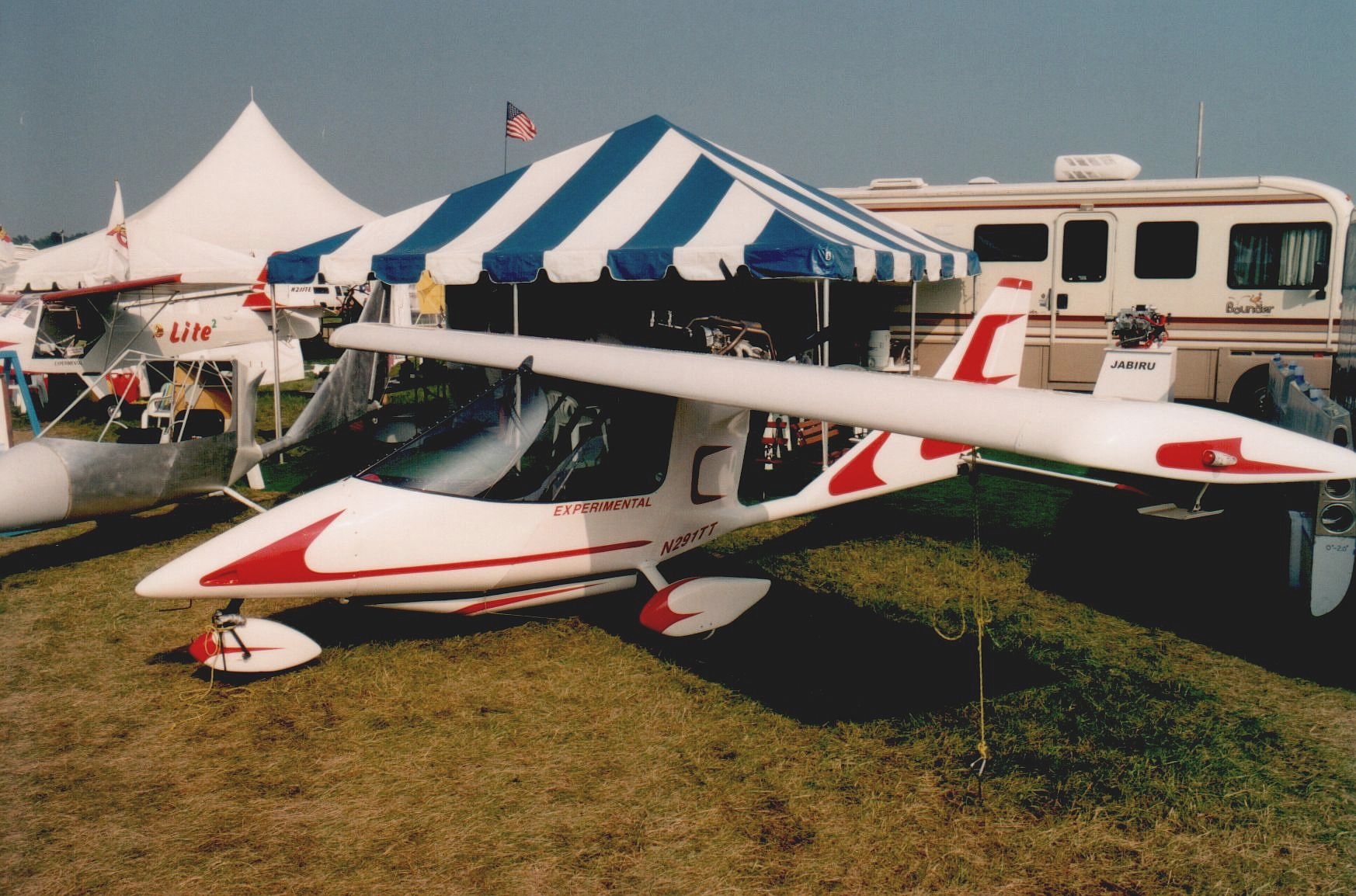
- Tornado II

General information
- Type: Kit aircraft
- National origin: United States
- Manufacturer: Titan Aircraft
- Status: In production

History
- Manufactured: 1994–present
- Introduction date: 1994
- Developed from: Earthstar Thunder Gull J

The Titan Tornado is large family of cantilever high-wing, pusher configuration, tricycle gear-equipped kit aircraft manufactured by Titan Aircraft of Austinburg, Ohio, for amateur construction.

== Design and development ==
The first in the Tornado series, the Tornado 103, which started development in 1990, was introduced in 1994 and designed to fit into the US FAR 103 Ultralight Vehicles category, meeting the 254 lb (115 kg) empty weight limit. If equipped with a light enough engine the Tornado 103 could qualify as a US ultralight.

The Tornado borrows from the design of the Earthstar Thunder Gull J and shares a similar cantilever wing of small area, keeping stall speeds low by use of flaps. This low drag design manages high cross country speeds as a result. The cockpit is constructed from 4130 steel, while the fuselage boom tube and the wings are built from aluminium. Unlike the Gull's wing, which is aircraft fabric-covered or optionally finished in sheet aluminium, the Tornado's wing is stressed skin. The Tornado has a tricycle undercarriage with a supplemental tailwheel castor, as the aircraft sits on its tail when unoccupied.

== Operational history ==
The Tornado 103 was named Ultralight Grand Champion at Sun 'n Fun 1994.

== Variants ==
Tornado 103
The first version, a single seater, intended for the US ultralight category with a 20 ft (6.1 m) wingspan. Standard engine was the 28 hp (21 kW) Rotax 277. No longer in production. Reported construction time is 300 hours. Ten were reported flying in 1998.
Tornado Sport
Improved single seater version intended for the US homebuilt category with a 20 ft (6.1 m) wingspan. Standard engine is the 52 hp (39 kW) Rotax 503. No longer in production. Reported construction time is 300 hours. 89 were reported flying in 1999.
Tornado MG
Single seater version intended for the US homebuilt category, with a 26 ft (7.9 m) wingspan. The wing is detachable for storage or transport. Standard engine is the 40 hp (30 kW) Rotax 447 and optional engines included the 52 hp (39 kW) Rotax 503, 64 hp (48 kW) Rotax 582, 74 hp (55 kW) Rotax 618 and the 80 hp (60 kW) Rotax 912UL. No longer in production. Reported construction time is 350 hours. Five were reported flying in 2011.
Tornado I
Improved version of the Tornado Sport, intended for the US homebuilt category or light-sport aircraft category as its standard empty weight is 375 lb (170 kg). Standard engine is the 52 hp (39 kW) Rotax 503. Still in production.
Tornado I Sport
Single seat version, intended for the US homebuilt category as its standard empty weight is 320 lb (145 kg). Standard engine is the 52 hp (39 kW) Rotax 503. No longer in production. 180 were reported flying in 2011. Reported stall speed 30mph; cruise 95mph; max speed 113mph.

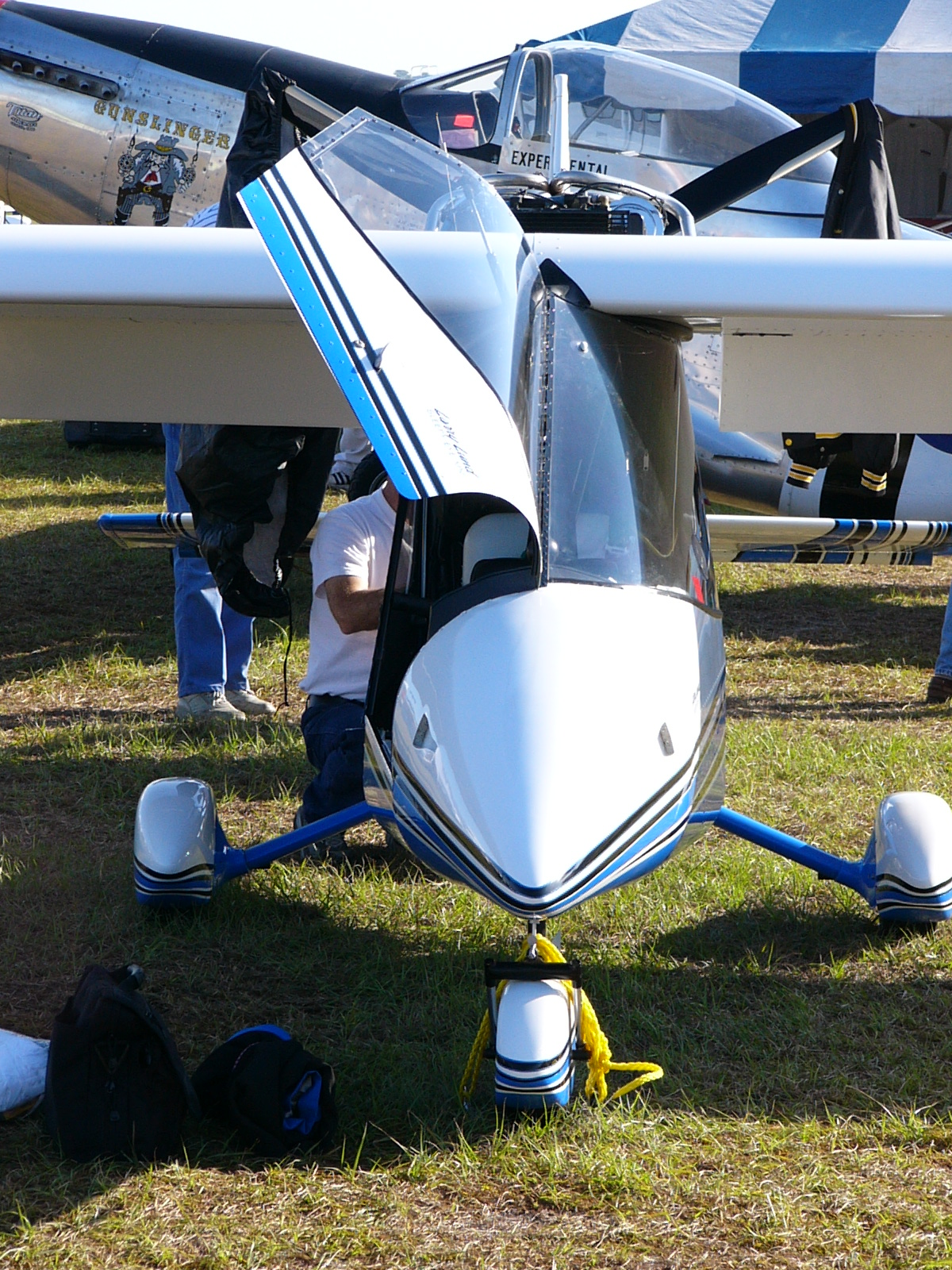
Tornado II

Tornado II
Two seats in tandem version, intended for the previous US ultralight trainer category and presently for the US homebuilt and light-sport categories. It has a 23.5 ft (7.2 m) wingspan. Standard engine is the 64 hp (48 kW) Rotax 582 and cruise speed is 100 mph (161 km/h) with that engine. Acceptable power range is 52 to 80 hp (39 to 60 kW). The 60 hp (45 kW) HKS 700E four-stroke engine has also been used. Still in production. Reported construction time is 350 hours. 120 were reported flying in 1998.
Tornado II Trainer
Two seats in tandem version, intended for the previous US ultralight trainer category. It has a 23.5 ft (7.2 m) wingspan. Standard engine is the 64 hp (48 kW) Rotax 582. Acceptable power range is 52 to 80 hp (39 to 60 kW). No longer in production. Reported construction time is 350 hours. 510 were reported flying in 2011.
Tornado II Sport
Two seats in tandem version, intended for the US homebuilt category. It has a 23.5 ft (7.2 m) wingspan. Standard engine is the 80 hp (60 kW) Rotax 912UL. Acceptable power range is 50 to 80 hp (37 to 60 kW). No longer in production. Reported construction time is 350 hours. 500 were reported flying in 2003.
Tornado II 912
Two seats in tandem version, intended for the US homebuilt category. It has a 23.5 ft (7.2 m) wingspan. Standard engine is the 80 hp (60 kW) Rotax 912 and cruise speed is 120 mph (193 km/h) with that engine. Acceptable power range is 52 to 80 hp (39 to 60 kW). No longer in production. 145 were reported flying in 1999.
Tornado II FP
Two seats in tandem amphibious floatplane version, intended for the US homebuilt category with a 23.5 ft (7.2 m) wingspan. Standard engine is the 74 hp (55 kW) Rotax 618 and cruise speed is 105 mph (169 km/h) with that engine. Out of production. Reported construction time is 350 hours. Twelve were reported flying in 2001.
Tornado MG II
Two seats in tandem version, with a 26 ft (7.9 m) wingspan. The wing is detachable for storage or transport. Standard engine is the 40 hp (30 kW) Rotax 447 and the acceptable power range is 40 to 80 hp (30 to 60 kW). No longer in production. Reported construction time is 400 hours. Eight were reported flying in 2001.
Tornado S
Two seats in tandem "stretched" fuselage version, intended for the US homebuilt and light-sport categories. It has a 23.5 ft (7.2 m) wingspan. Standard engine is the 100 hp (75 kW) Rotax 912ULS and cruise speed is 120 mph (193 km/h) with that engine. Acceptable power range is 52 to 120 hp (39 to 89 kW) and alternate engines include the 52 hp (39 kW) Rotax 503, 64 hp (48 kW) Rotax 582, 80 hp (60 kW) Rotax 912UL, 85 hp (63 kW) Jabiru 2200, or the 120 hp (89 kW) Jabiru 3300. Still in production. Reported construction time is 300 hours. 55 reported flying in 2011.

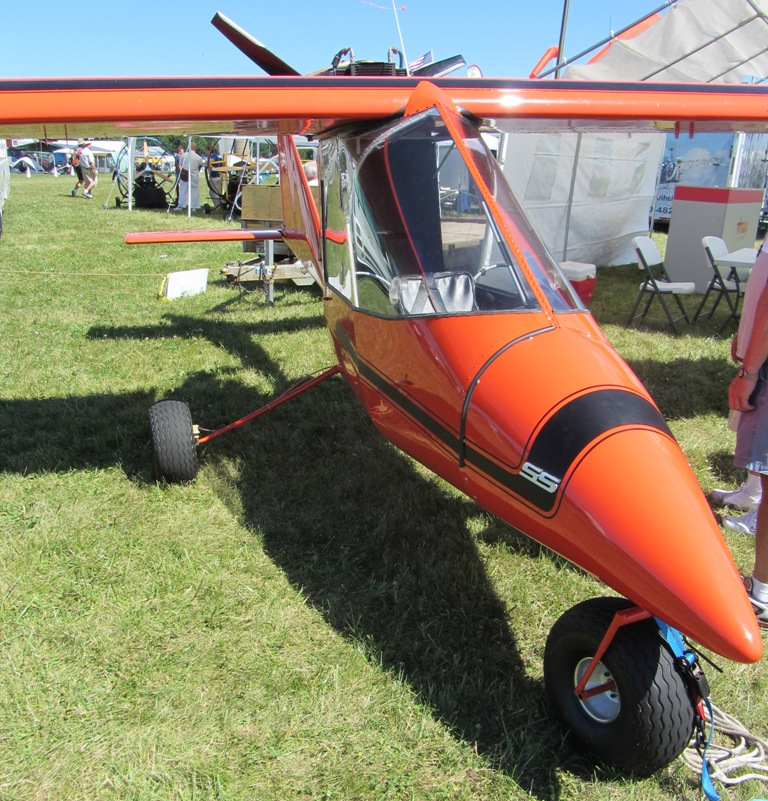
Titan Tornado SS

Tornado SS
Two seats in tandem "super stretched" fuselage version, intended for the US homebuilt and light-sport categories. It features a longer and higher cockpit area with 4 in (10 cm) more headroom that the Tornado II along with a bigger rear door and a full-sized back seat. It has a 26 ft (7.9 m) wingspan. Acceptable power range is 80 to 120 hp (60 to 89 kW) and engines include the 80 hp (60 kW) Rotax 912UL, 100 hp (75 kW) Rotax 912ULS, 85 hp (63 kW) Jabiru 2200, or the 120 hp (89 kW) Jabiru 3300. Still in production. Twenty reported as flying in 2011.

== Specifications (Tornado 103) ==
Data from Cliche

General characteristics

- Crew: one
- Length: 18 ft 6 in (5.64 m)
- Wingspan: 20 ft 0 in (6.10 m)
- Height: 6 ft 6 in (1.98 m)
- Empty weight: 250 lb (113 kg)
- Gross weight: 550 lb (249 kg)
- Fuel capacity: 5 US Gallons (19 litres)
- Powerplant: 1 × Rotax 277 single cylinder, two-stroke aircraft engine, 28 hp (21 kW)
- Propellers: 2-bladed wooden

Performance

- Cruise speed: 60 mph (97 km/h, 52 kn)
- Stall speed: 25 mph (40 km/h, 22 kn) flaps down
- Range: 120 mi (190 km, 100 nmi)
- Service ceiling: 10,000 ft (3,000 m)
- Rate of climb: 850 ft/min (4.3 m/s)

== See also ==
Related development

- Earthstar Thunder Gull J

Aircraft of comparable role, configuration, and era

- Excalibur Aircraft Excalibur
- Quad City Challenger
