= Alpha J-5 Marco =

J-5 Marco
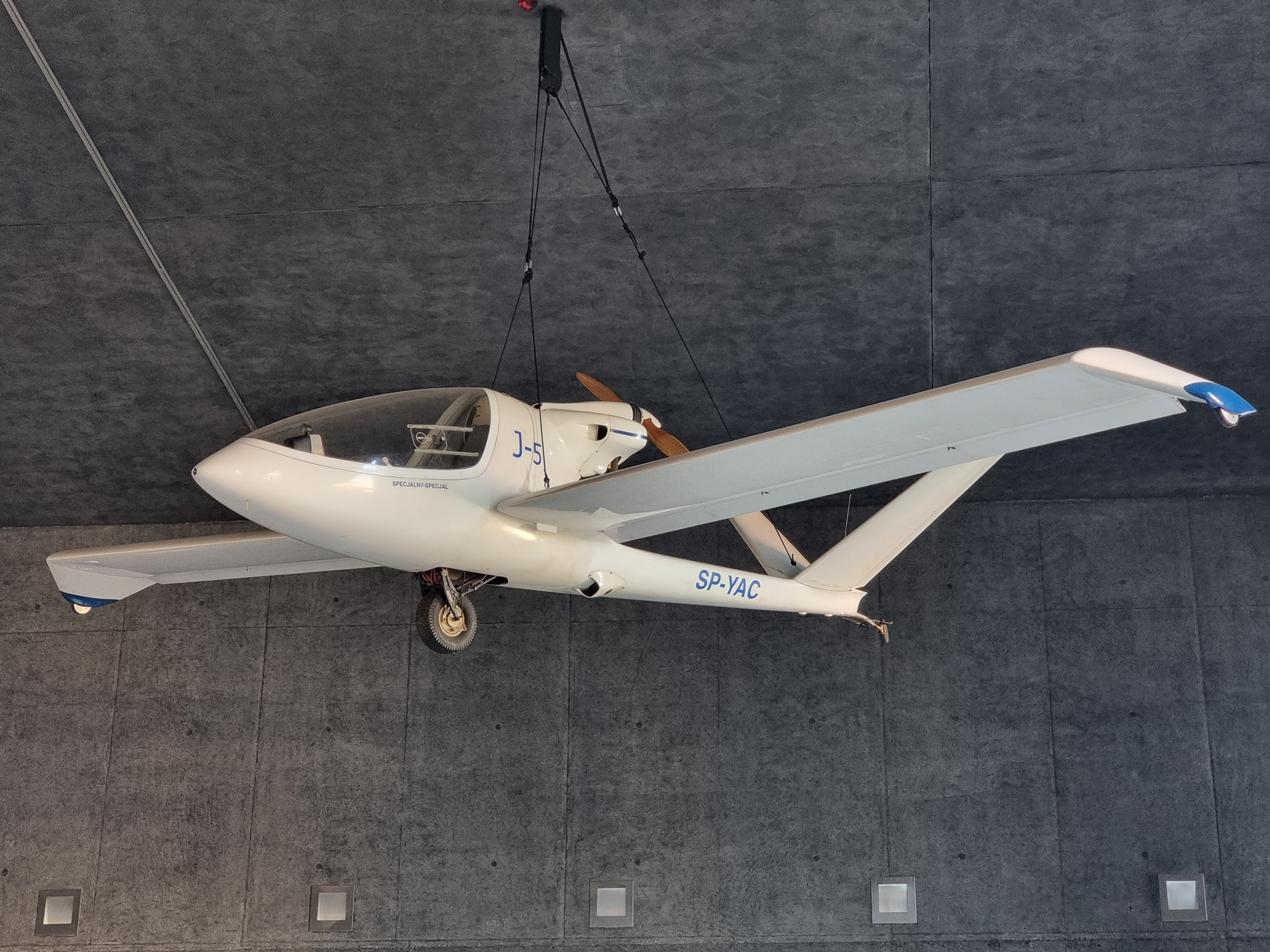

General information
- Type: homebuilt motor glider
- National origin: Poland
- Manufacturer: Alpha, Kraków
- Designer: Jaroslaw Janowski
- Number built: About 36

History
- First flight: 30 October 1983

The Alpha J-5 Marco is a single-seat airplane in pod-and-boom pusher configuration. Kits were built in Poland and the aircraft has been exported to several countries including Germany and the USA.

== Design and development ==
The Alpha J-5 Marco, sometimes known as the Janowski J-5 Marco after its designer, whose fifth aircraft it was, sometimes just as the J-5 Marco, is a single-seat pod-and-boom aircraft, with a pusher engine and a butterfly tail. Janowski's earlier J-1, J-2 and J-3 designs were also pod-and-boom pushers, though with different tails. Designed to be homebuilt from a kit, the J-5's structure is almost entirely of glassfibre and epoxy. The wings are set at the top of the boom as it merges into the pod containing the engine and cockpit. They have an aspect ratio of about 10 and constant chord, with flaperons, formed with glassfibre and duralumin, along the whole of the trailing edge. The upper surfaces contain short spoilers at mid chord.

The pusher engine, usually a 25 hp (18.6 kW) KFM 107ER two-cylinder horizontally opposed two-stroke, is mounted on the upper rear of the pod. Some aircraft have been powered by a 45 hp (31 kW) Rotax 447UL two-cylinder inline two-stroke or a Hirth F23 boxer motor. Just forward is the long, curved canopy over the cockpit, which reaches almost to the nose. The Marco J-5 has side-stick control and instruments mounted above one another on a central vertical panel. Aft of the pod the boom is slender and carries a large butterfly tail with full span control surfaces.

Two undercarriage layouts are available, both using a trailing tailwheel. For optimum performance the Marco J-5 can be built with a glider-type retractable monowheel, using stabilizing wheels mounted in downturned trapezoidal wingtip extensions. Instead, a pair of fixed faired cantilever-mounted wheels sprung out from the fuselage pod can be used.

The J-5 Marco first flew on 30 October 1983. The most likely last J-5 to be built is currently under construction in Germany.

== Operational history ==
The kits for the J-5 Marco were originally produced at the Marko-Elektronic Factory in Łódź, Poland, where an aircraft branch was established for the purpose. By about 1990 this division was known as Alpha and relocated to Kraków. In the same year Aviation Farm Ltd in Poland bought a licence to produce assembled aircraft. Distribution agencies were established in Germany (Hewa-Technics, who produced both kits and complete aircraft) and in the USA (Alpha/USA).

Six J-5 Marcos were registered in the US, one in the UK and eight in the rest of Europe (west of Russia). By 1996, Aviation Farm had delivered 20 complete aircraft and had another 29 on order.

Alain Flottard's French registered J-5 F-WZUE set several FAI class C-1a/0 records in 1990–1, most of which still stand.

== Variants ==
Aviation Farm marketed or planned two variants in addition to the mono- and conventional undercarriage versions noted above:

J-5 BAL
Carrying a thermal imaging camera for military use.
J-5 bis
48.5 kW (65 hp) Walter M202 two-stroke engine.

BAE HERTI-D
A J-5 Marco was used by BAE Systems as the basis of this early UAV or drone. It was a standard monowheel J-5 with a small turbojet engine replacing the flat two-stroke. The canopy was replaced with a moulding of similar shape but with an engine air intake in its upper part. Later BAE UAVs were based on the larger J-6 Fregata.

== Specifications ==
Data from Jane's All the World's Aircraft 1991/2

General characteristics

- Crew: one
- Length: 4.66 m (15 ft 3 in)
- Wingspan: 8.16 m (26 ft 9 in)
- Height: 1.40 m (4 ft 7 in)
- Wing area: 6.3 m^{2} (68 sq ft) gross
- Airfoil: Wortmann FX67-K170/17
- Empty weight: 165 kg (364 lb)
- Max takeoff weight: 290 kg (639 lb)
- Powerplant: 1 × IAME KFM 107ER two cylinder horizontally opposed two stroke, 19 kW (25 hp)
- Propellers: 2-bladed, 1.15 m (3 ft 9 in) diameter

Performance

- Cruise speed: 150 km/h (93 mph, 81 kn) economical
- Stall speed: 78 km/h (48 mph, 42 kn)
- Range: 547 km (340 mi, 295 nmi) with maximum fuel
- Service ceiling: 3,050 m (10,010 ft) service
- g limits: +6/-3
- Maximum glide ratio: 16:1
- Rate of climb: 3.03 m/s (596 ft/min)
