= Titan Aircraft =

American aircraft kit manufacturer

Titan Aircraft Company
- Type: Private company
- Industry: Aerospace
- Headquarters: Frankford, Missouri, United States
- Products: aircraft kits
- Website: www.titanaircraft.com

Titan Aircraft was an aircraft kit manufacturer, founded in Austinburg, Ohio in the 1990's. They produced kits for the Titan T-51 Mustang, which is a 3/4 scale replica of the P-51 Mustang and several versions of the Tornado ultralight/light-sport aircraft. In late 2024 the company made a significant transition. Titan Aircraft's assets, including parts, tooling and intellectual property, were purchased by Air Cover Engineering in Northeast Missouri. A new 17,600-square-foot facility is under construction in Frankford and is scheduled to be completed in November 2025. The new ownership is committed to supporting existing Titan aircraft owners and continue production of parts for the T-51 and Tornado aircraft. Air Cover Engineering anticipates resuming new kit sales in the future and may consider expanding the product line to include new models.

== Aircraft produced ==
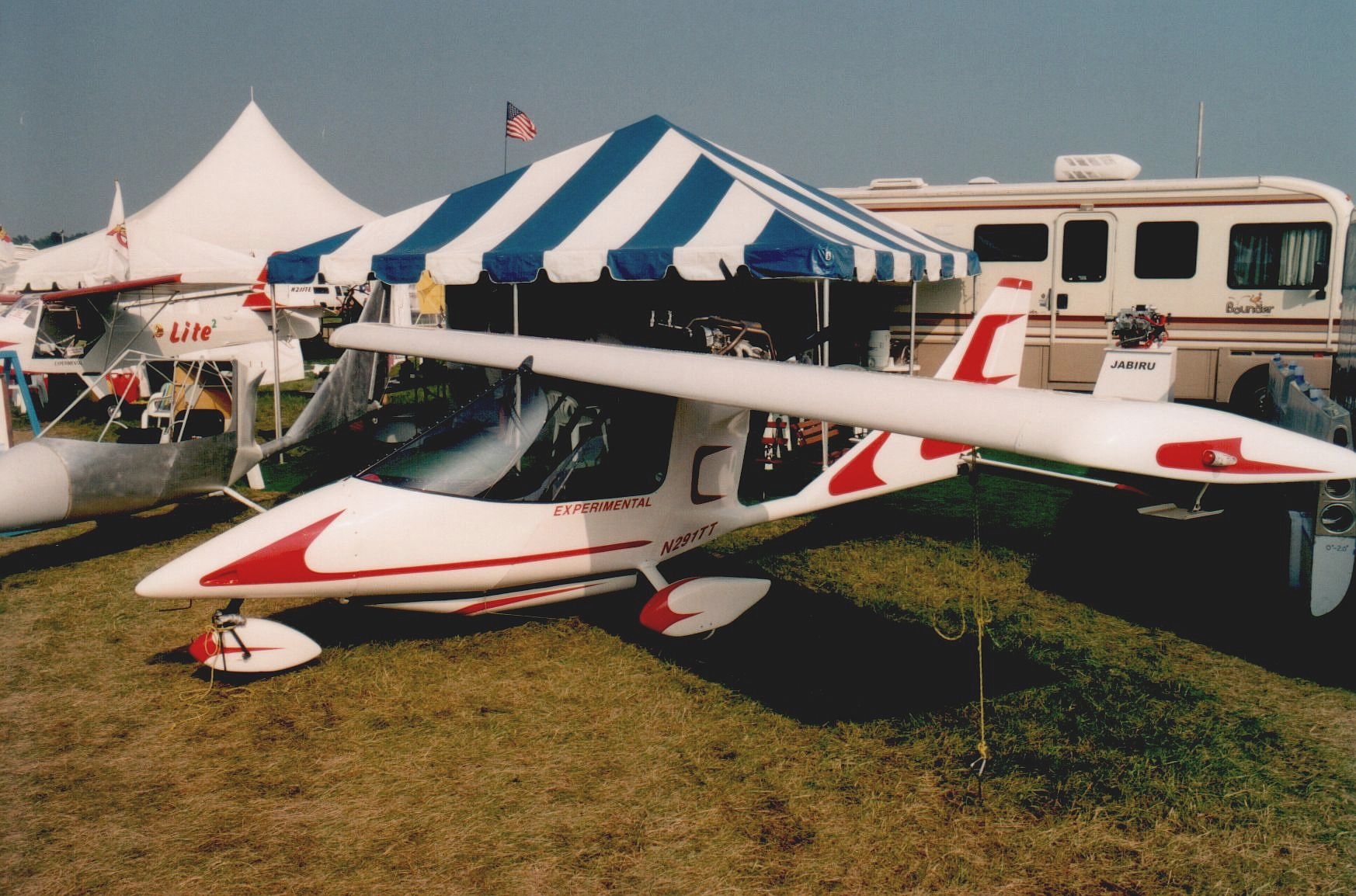
Titan Tornado II at EAA AirVenture Oshkosh in 2001

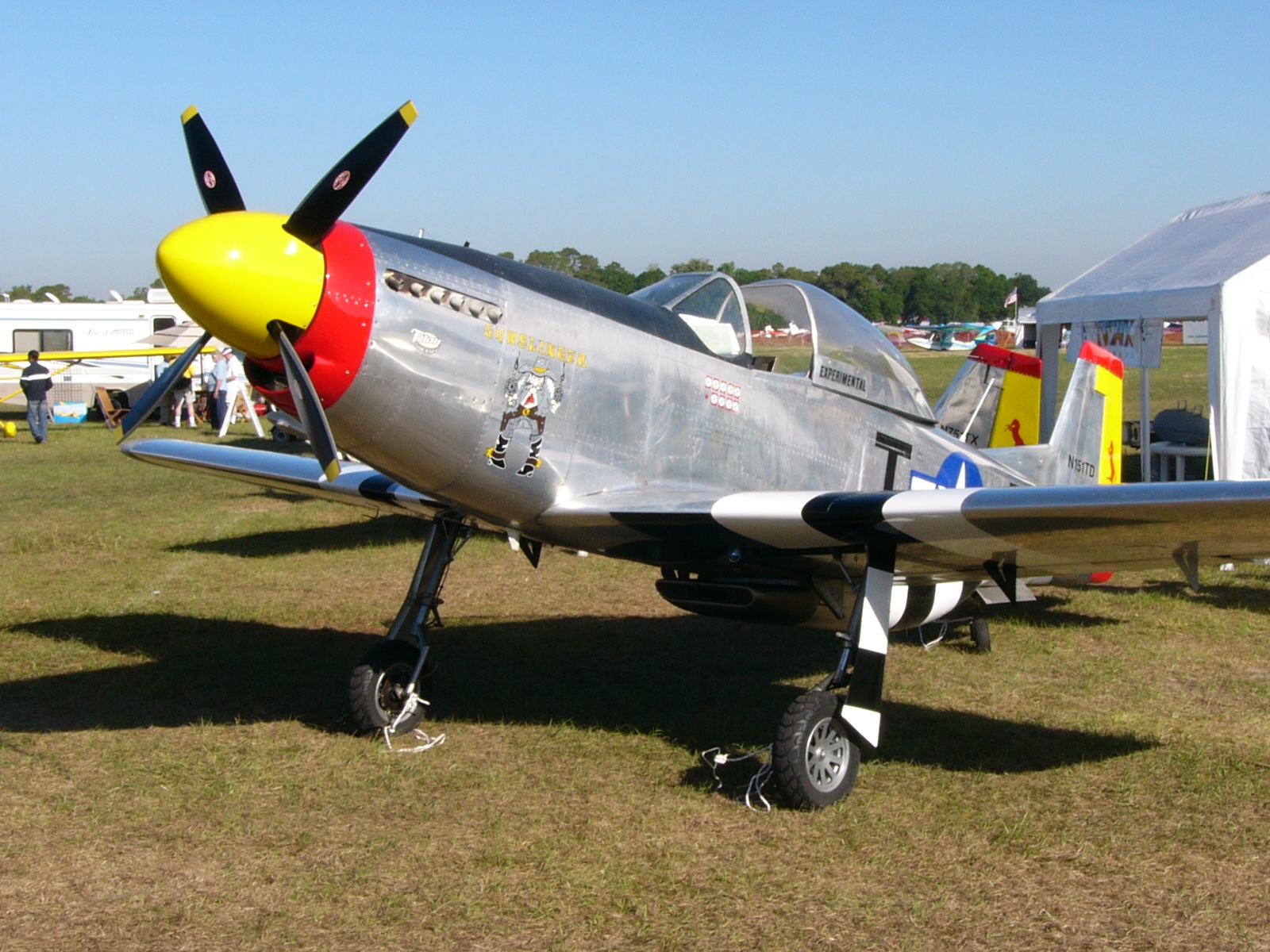
Titan T-51 Mustang at Sun 'n Fun 2006

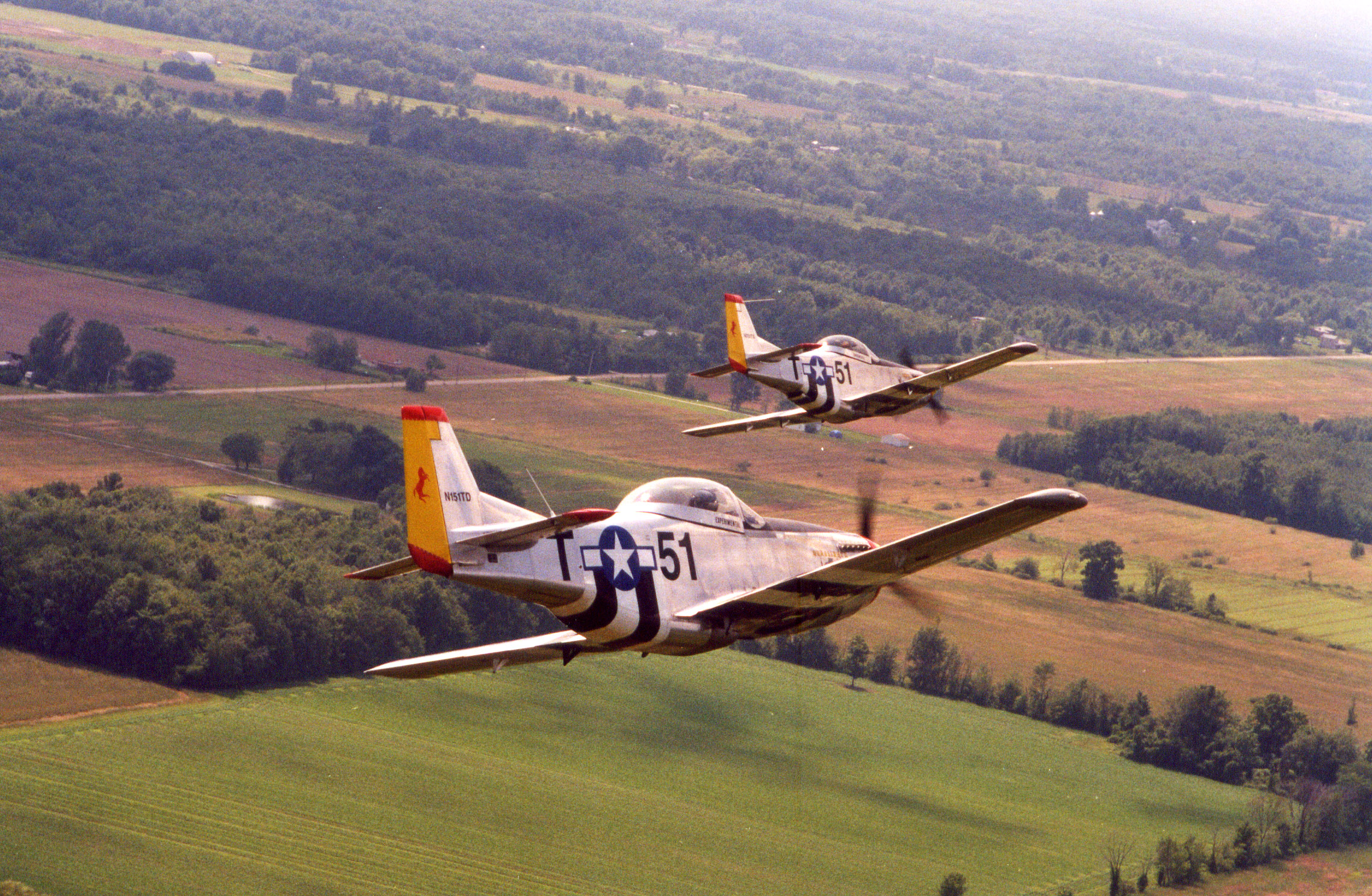
Two T-51 Mustangs flying in formation
