= Quad City Challenger =

American ultralight aircraft

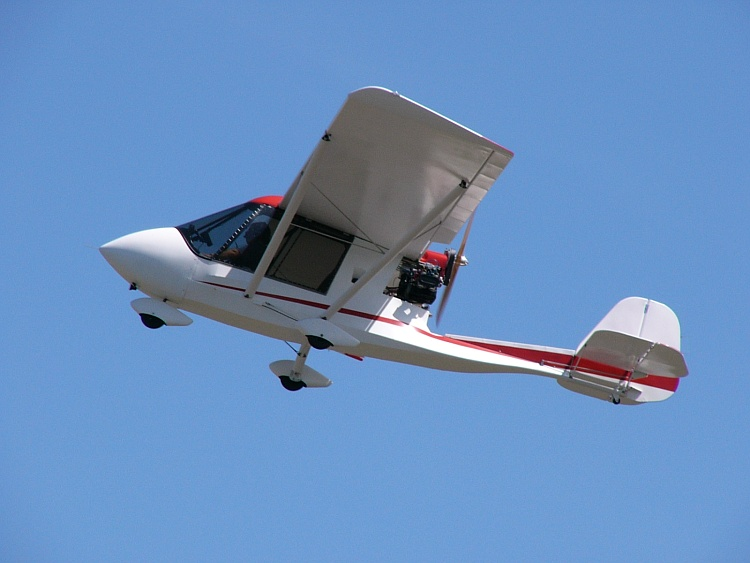
- Challenger II

General information
- Type: Ultralight aircraft
- Manufacturer: Quad City Aircraft Corporation
- Status: In production (2018)
- Number built: 3,571 (2011)

History
- Manufactured: 1983-present
- First flight: 1983
- Variant: Excalibur Aircraft Excalibur

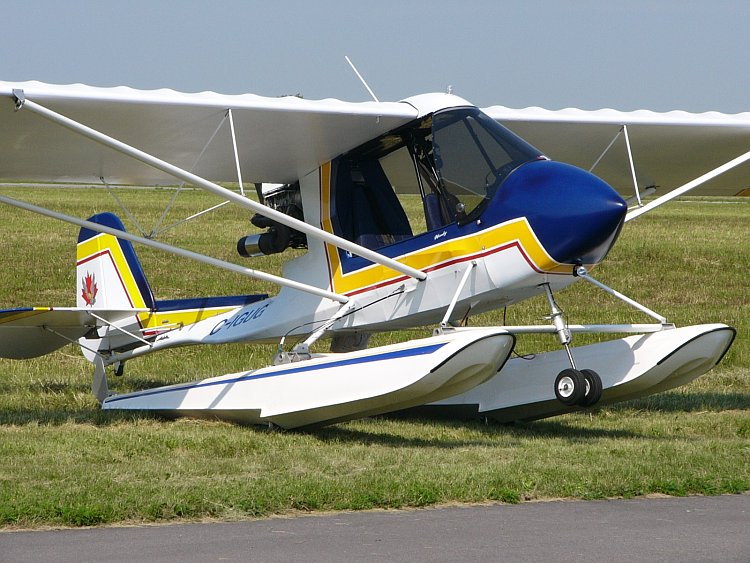
Challenger II on amphibious floats

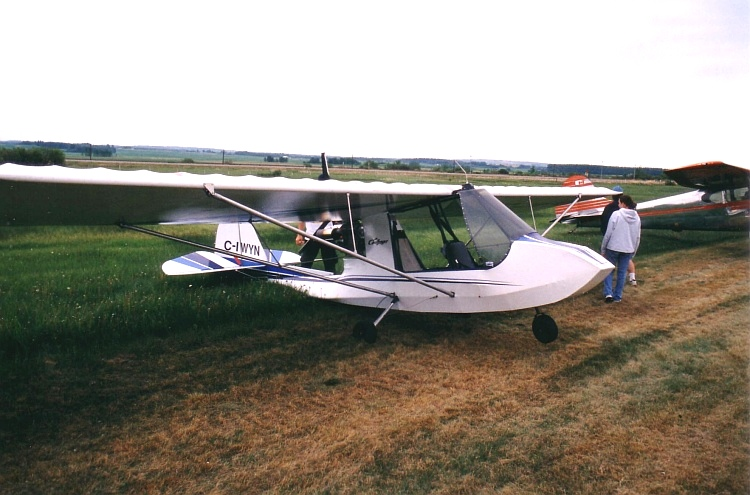
A 1994 model Challenger with the earlier frame style nose. Most newer Challengers have a fibreglass conical nosecone instead.

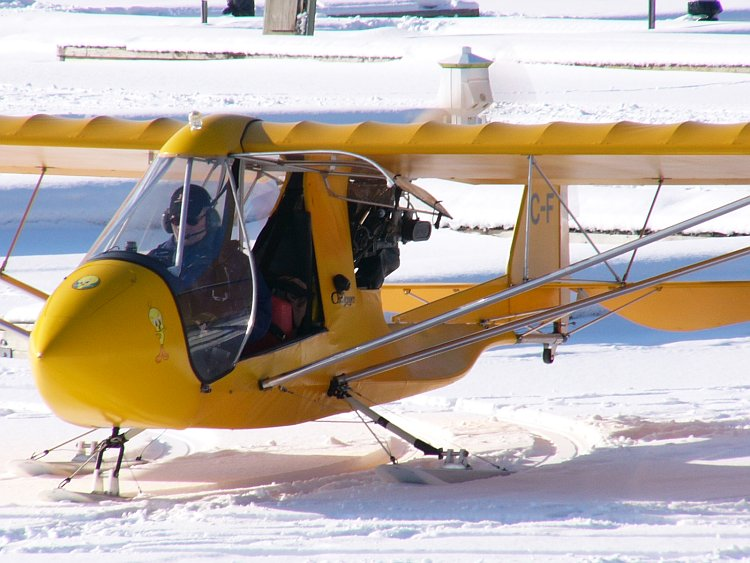
Challenger II on skis

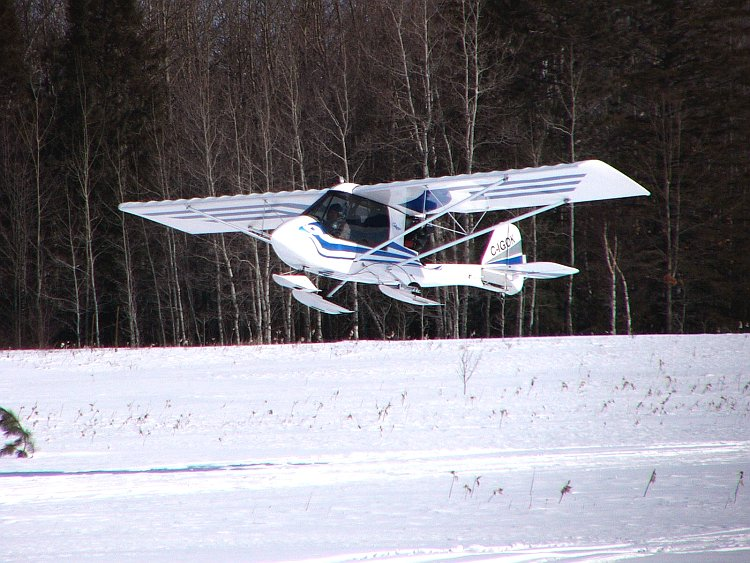
Challenger II landing on skis

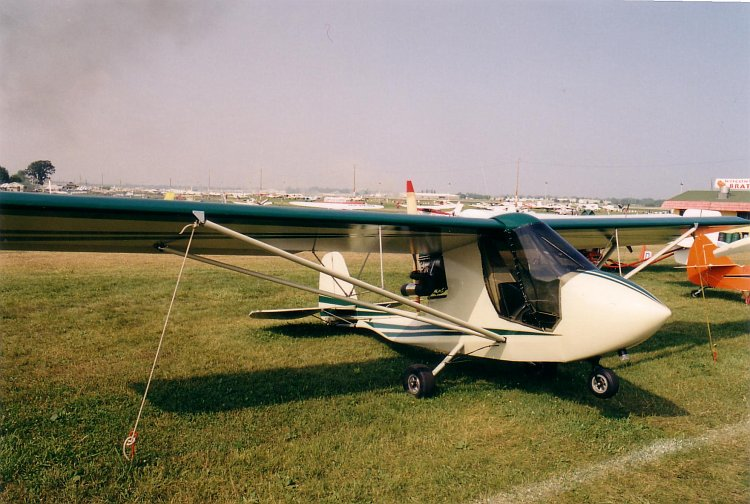
Challenger I single seat ultralight

The Quad City Challenger is a family of one and two seats-in-tandem, pusher configuration, tricycle landing gear ultralight aircraft that is designed and produced by Quad City Aircraft Corporation of Moline, Illinois. The Challenger was first introduced in 1983.

== Design and development ==
The Challenger ultralight is a high wing, tricycle gear kit aircraft with a frame structure built from 6061-T6 aluminum alloy tubing fastened with aircraft grade AN bolts and rivets and covered with either presewn Dacron envelopes or standard aircraft fabric. The engine is mounted in pusher configuration and turns the propeller through a reduction drive that uses a cogged tooth rubber belt.

The kit can be purchased in 4 major sub-kits: the Tail Assembly, Fuselage, Wings, and Engine. The factory kit is supplied with the most difficult mechanical work already completed. This includes the primary fuselage framework along with the controls and the basic wing structures assembled at the factory. The kit builder is required to finish the smaller structural components, cover the aluminum frames with fabric, seal and paint the fabric and do the final assembly.

The aircraft has the ability to soar with its motor switched off.

The Challenger design has been criticized by reviewers for its landing gear, which is a rigid cable-braced type and is subject to being bent during hard landings. A number of after-market suppliers have designed steel gear legs as replacements for the stock landing gear in an attempt to rectify this problem. The improved factory-designed Light Sport Special (LSS) model incorporates revised landing gear to address this deficiency.

In November 2018, the design was subject to a Transportation Safety Board of Canada Aviation Safety Advisory due to an accident on 30 July 2018 where a Challenger crashed and the pilot was killed. The investigation determined that the right front lift strut lower bracket had failed due to fatigue after only 402.2 hours in service. The bracket has a 500 hour component life and is subject to 50 hour periodic inspections. Examination of 22 other Challengers found eight that also had cracked brackets.

== Variants ==
Challenger I (Challenger UL)
Single seat, 31.5 ft (9.6 m) wingspan gives lower stall speed. Can be fitted with a variety of engines. Qualifies as a US "Experimental - Amateur-Built", Light sport aircraft or with the 22 hp (16 kW) Hirth F-33 engine as a US FAR 103 Ultralight Vehicle, 800 reported completed and flown by the fall of 2011.
Challenger I Special
Single seat, 26 ft (7.9 m) wingspan gives faster roll rate. Engines 40 hp (30 kW) Rotax 447, 50 hp (37 kW) Rotax 503, 64 hp (48 kW) 582 or 60 hp (45 kW) HKS 700E. Qualifies as a US Experimental - Amateur-Built or Light sport aircraft, 300 reported completed and flown by the fall of 2011.
Challenger II
Two seats in tandem, 31.5 ft (9.6 m) wingspan provides more lift and lower stall speed. Can be equipped with floats. Engines 40 hp (30 kW) Rotax 447, 50 hp (37 kW) Rotax 503, 64 hp (48 kW) 582 or 60 hp (45 kW) HKS 700E. Qualifies as a US Experimental - Amateur-Built or Light sport aircraft, 2000 reported completed and flown by the fall of 2011.
Challenger II Special
Two seats in tandem, 26 ft (7.9 m) wingspan gives faster roll rate. Engines 40 hp (30 kW) Rotax 447, 50 hp (37 kW) Rotax 503, 64 hp (48 kW) 582 or 60 hp (45 kW) HKS 700E. Qualifies as a US Experimental - Amateur-Built or Light sport aircraft, 350 reported completed and flown by the fall of 2011.
Challenger II CW LSS
Two seats in tandem, 26 ft (7.9 m). Engine 50 hp (37 kW) Rotax 503, 64 hp (48 kW) 582 or 60 hp (45 kW) HKS 700E. This model incorporates many revisions to the basic Challenger design, including a larger and re-shaped vertical fin, fiberglass wing tips and redesigned landing gear. Qualifies as a US Light sport aircraft, 110 reported completed and flown by the fall of 2011.
Challenger II LSS XL-65
Two seats in tandem, 29 ft (8.8 m). Engine 65 hp (48 kW) Rotax 582. Qualifies as a US Light sport aircraft, ten reported completed and flown by the fall of 2011.

== Specifications (Challenger II) ==
Data from Challenger.ca

General characteristics

- Crew: one
- Capacity: one passenger and 500 lb (227 kg) useful load
- Length: 20 ft (6.1 m)
- Wingspan: 31 ft 6 in (9.60 m)
- Height: 6 ft 0 in (1.83 m)
- Wing area: 177 sq ft (16.4 m^{2})
- Empty weight: 460 lb (209 kg)
- Max takeoff weight: 960 lb (435 kg)
- Powerplant: 1 × Rotax 503 twin cylinder, inline, two stroke, piston aircraft engine, 50 hp (37 kW)

Performance

- Maximum speed: 96 mph (154 km/h, 83 kn)
- Cruise speed: 85 mph (137 km/h, 74 kn)
- Stall speed: 28 mph (45 km/h, 24 kn)
- Never exceed speed: 100 mph (160 km/h, 87 kn)
- Range: 200 mi (320 km, 170 nmi)
- Rate of climb: 750 ft/min (3.8 m/s)
- Wing loading: 5.42 lb/sq ft (26.5 kg/m^{2})
- Power/mass: 19.2 lb/hp (0.087 kW/kg)

== See also ==
Related development

- Excalibur Aircraft Excalibur

Aircraft of comparable role, configuration, and era

- Birdman Chinook
- CGS Hawk
- Danieli Piuma
- Earthstar Thunder Gull
- Freebird II
- Lockwood Drifter
- Rans S-12 Airaile
- Spectrum Beaver
- Titan Tornado
- US Light Aircraft Hornet
