= Earthstar Thunder Gull =

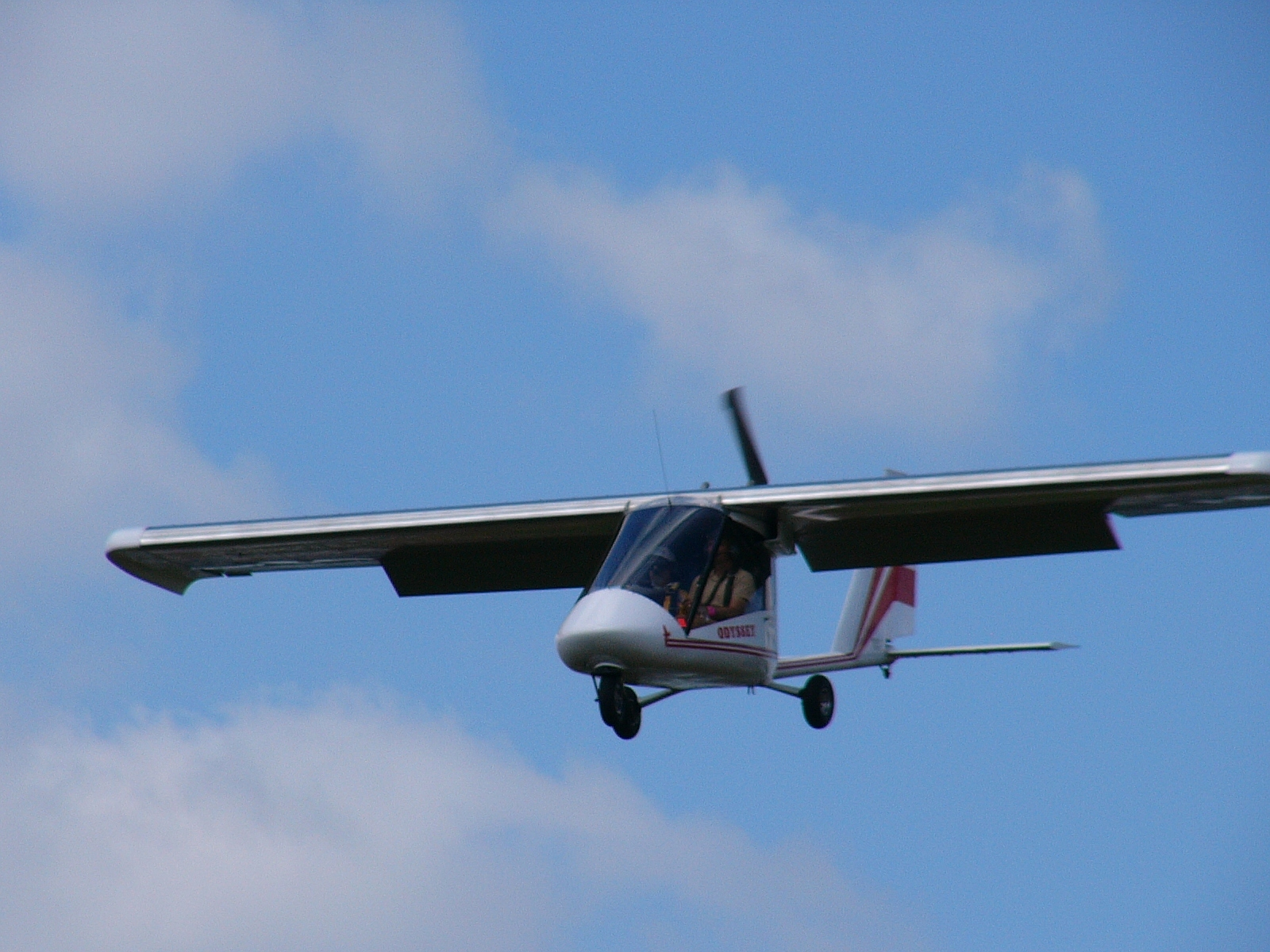
- Earthstar Thunder Gull Odyssey

General information
- Type: Ultralight aircraft
- National origin: United States
- Manufacturer: Earthstar Aircraft
- Designer: Mark Beierle
- Status: In production (2012)

History
- Introduction date: 1987 (Thunder Gull)
- First flight: March 1987 (Thunder Gull)

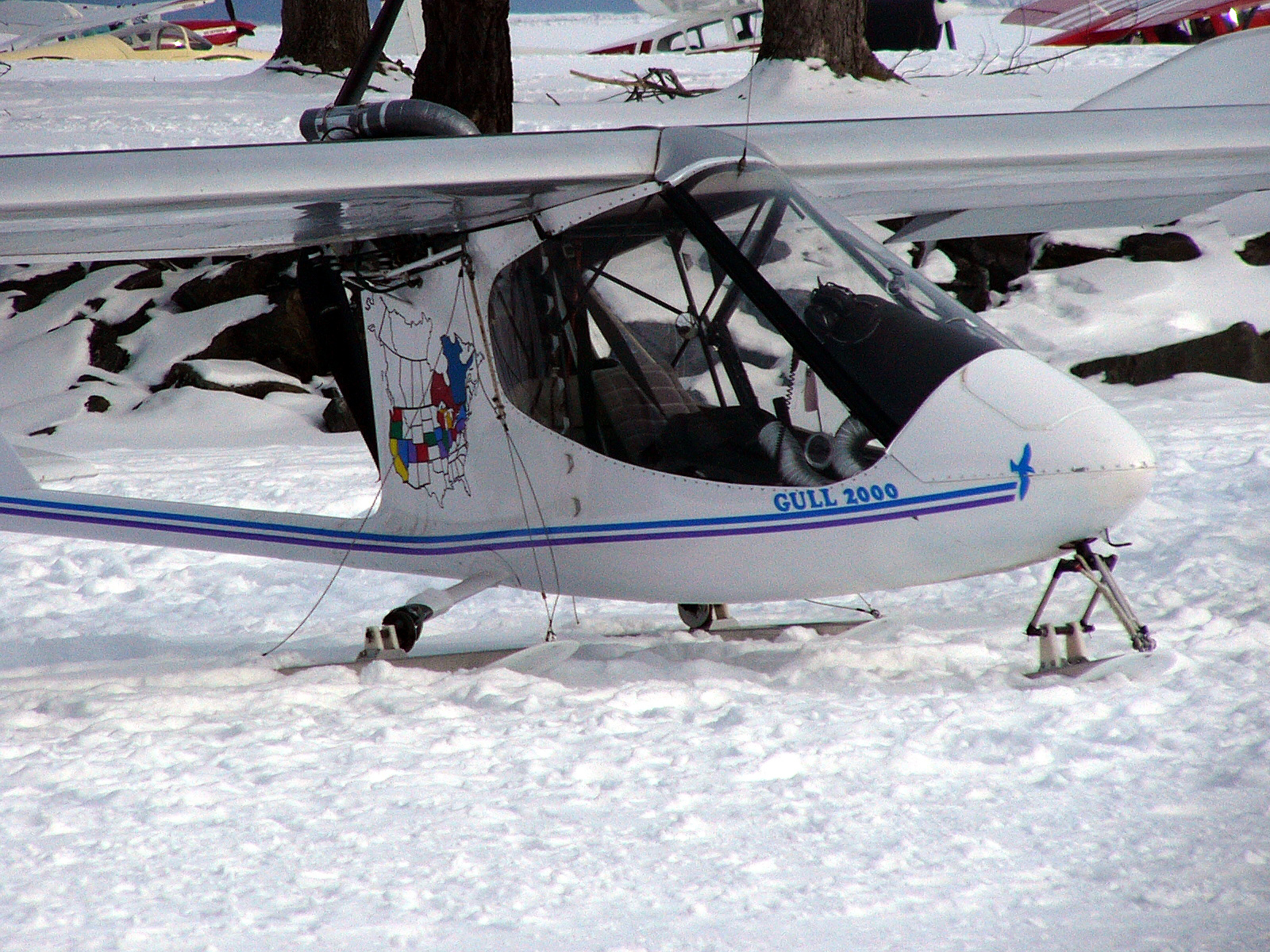
Gull 2000 on skis

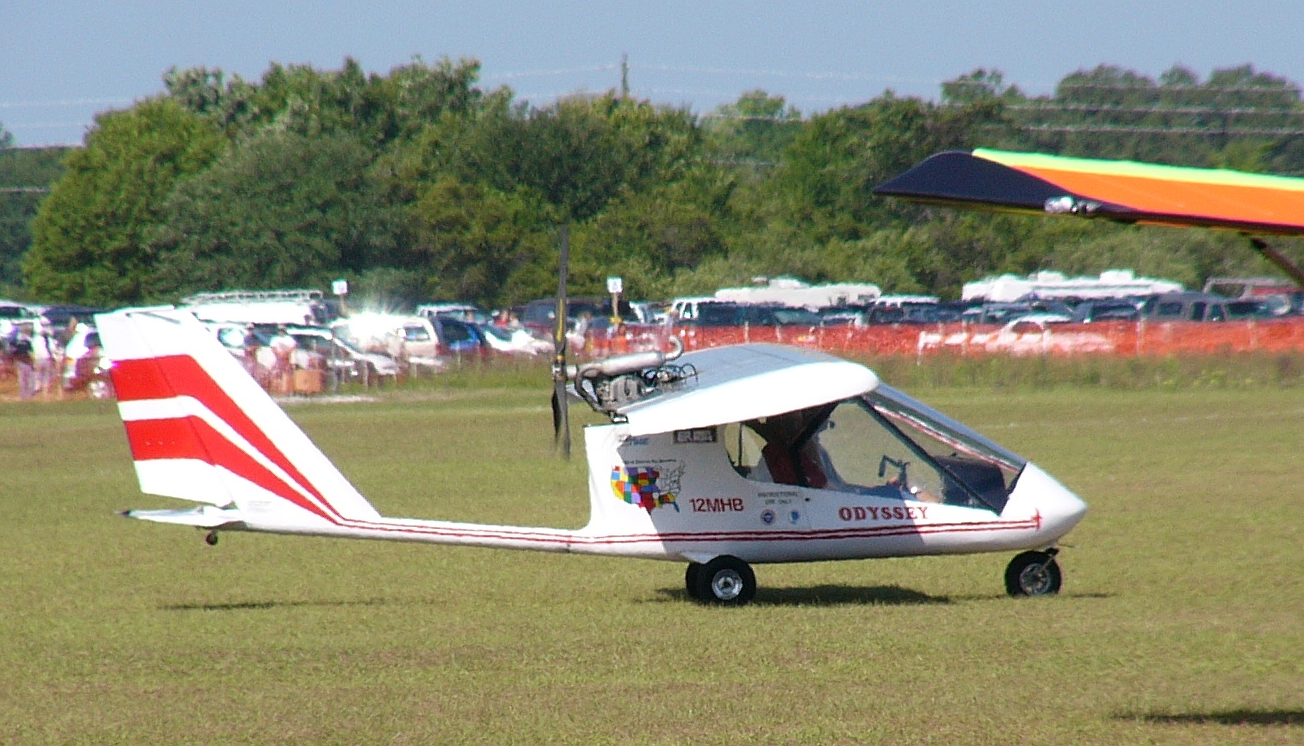
Thunder Gull Odyssey

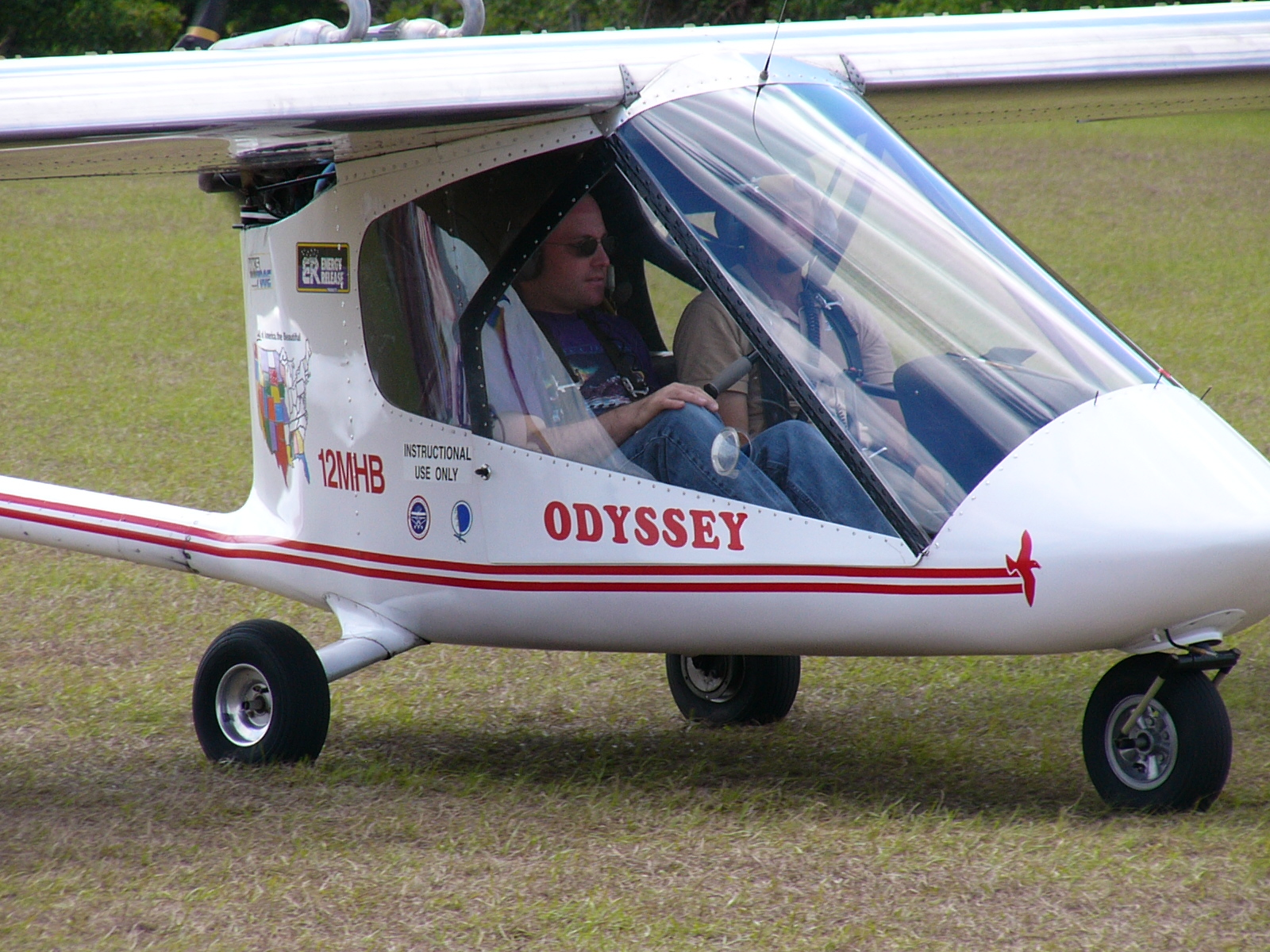
Thunder Gull Odyssey showing the unusual staggered side-by-side seating arrangement

The Earthstar Thunder Gull is a family of cantilever high-wing, tricycle gear ultralight aircraft, manufactured by Earthstar Aircraft of Santa Margarita, California as a kit for amateur construction or as a completed aircraft.

== Design and development ==
Designer Mark Beierle's original goals were an "airplane with the feel of a hang glider, the agility and visibility of a helicopter, the effortless smooth flight of a sailplane, and the utility and economy of a general aviation aircraft--all in the hopes of getting close to the feel and freedom of a bird." When queried by interviewer Don Downie if that was too much to ask, Beierle replied, "You bet! But it didn't stop me from trying."

The Thunder Gull was introduced in 1987 as a development of the earlier Laughing Gull. The aircraft was quite revolutionary when it was introduced due to its high performance and particularly high cruise speed of 55 mph (89 km/h) on just 28 hp (21 kW).

The aircraft is constructed from aluminum tubing and sheet parts and covered in aircraft fabric. The aircraft can meet the requirements of the US FAR 103 Ultralight Vehicles category, including its maximum empty weight limitation of 254 lb (115 kg) when it is equipped with a lightweight engine.

The aircraft has a very small wing for the US ultralight category with a wing area of only 95 sq ft (8.8 m^{2}) and a wingspan of 17.6 ft (5.4 m). The wing is equipped with flaps that give it a stall speed of 25 mph (40 km/h). The small wing gives the aircraft a high cruise speed and better resistance to turbulence than a lighter-loaded wing. The one-piece wing is quickly removable for storage or transport.

Reported construction time of the kit is 150 hours.

== Operational history ==
The prototype Laughing Gull was flown coast-to-coast across the USA seven times with 100 lb (45 kg) of baggage and a 180 lb (82 kg) pilot.

== Variants ==
Laughing Gull
Original model introduced in 1976. First models had wire bracing and later strut-bracing before development of the cantilever wing. Production completed.
Thunder Gull
Single-seat, high-wing ultralight aircraft with a cantilever 17.6 ft (5.4 m) wing. The name was changed from Laughing Gull for marketing purposes. Production completed.
Thunder Gull J
Improved model with 20 ft (6.1 m) wingspan. Standard engine is the 28 hp (21 kW) Rotax 277 and the acceptable power range is 28 to 53 hp (21 to 40 kW). First flight was March 1987 and it was available as a kit or ready-to-fly. Production completed.
Thunder Gull JT2
Two seats in tandem model with dual controls and a 24 ft (7.3 m) wingspan. Standard engine is the 50 hp (37 kW) Rotax 503 and the acceptable power range is 40 to 80 hp (30 to 60 kW). The 64 hp (48 kW) Rotax 582 and 75 hp (56 kW) Rotax 618 two-stroke engines were optional. It was available as a kit or ready-to-fly and production is completed. First flight was June 1989.
Thunder Gull Odyssey
Two seats in an unusual staggered side-by-side configuration with dual controls in the form of a shared center stick and a 26 ft (7.9 m) wingspan. The staggered seating was used to provide most of the benefits of side-by-side seating without the associated drag penalty. The seat stagger is sufficient to provide pilot shoulder clearance. Standard engine is the 50 hp (37 kW) Rotax 503 and the acceptable power range is 40 to 80 hp (30 to 60 kW). The 60 hp (45 kW) HKS 700E has also been installed. It first flew in April 1995 and was introduced at Sun 'n Fun in 1995. It is available as a kit or ready-to-fly. Fifteen were reported completed by December 2011 and still in production in 2012. An electric aircraft version has been flown.
Soaring Gull
Motorglider version with 28 ft (8.5 m) wingspan and 16:1 glide ratio. Standard engine was the 28 hp (21 kW) Rotax 277 and then later the 28 hp (21 kW) Hirth F-33. The acceptable power range is 28 to 53 hp (21 to 40 kW). First flew in November 1993. Ten reported as completed by December 2011 and still in production in 2012.
Gull 2000
Updated version with 20 ft (6.1 m) wingspan, wider cockpit enclosure built from fiberglass. Standard engine was the Zanzottera MZ 34 of 27 hp (20 kW) and then later the 28 hp (21 kW) Hirth F-33. The acceptable power range is 27 to 60 hp (20 to 45 kW). Fifteen reported as completed by December 2011 and still in production in 2012.
eGull 2000
Electric powered variant

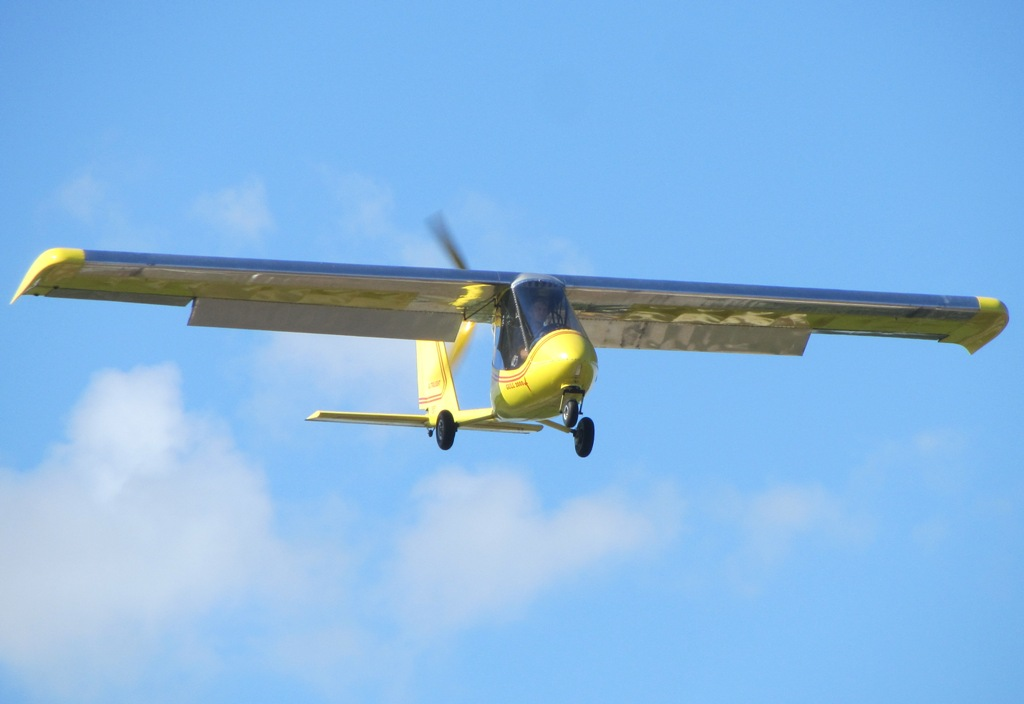
eGull 2000 in flight

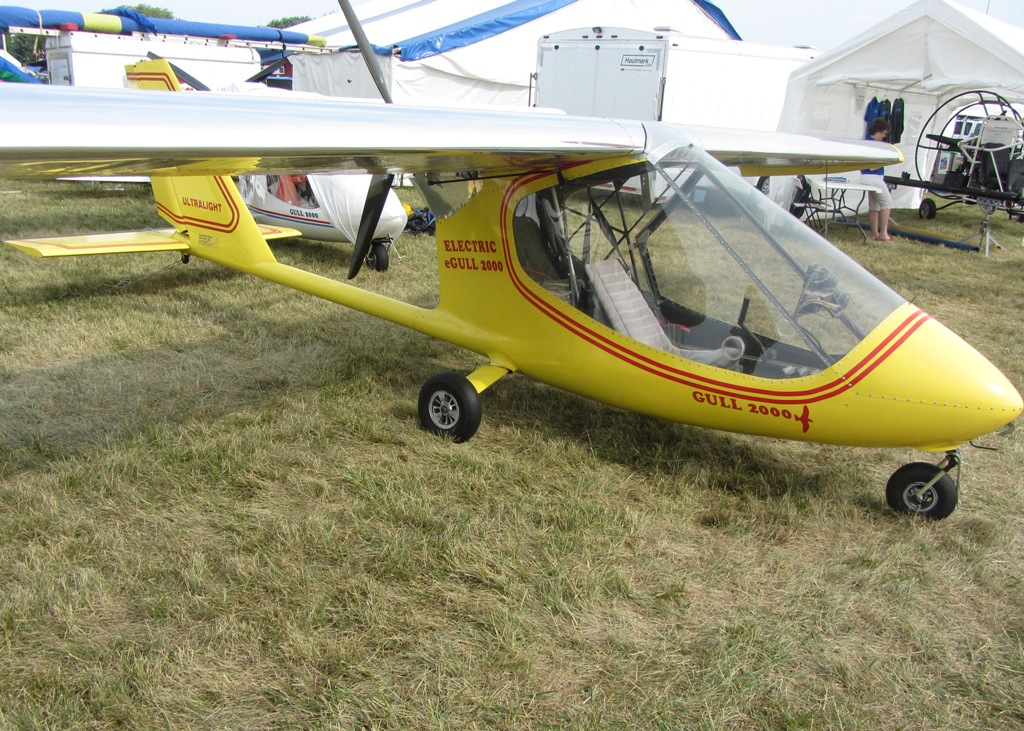
eGull 2000, an electric-powered variant

== Specifications (Thunder Gull) ==
Data from Cliche

General characteristics

- Crew: one
- Length: 17 ft 3 in (5.26 m)
- Wingspan: 17 ft 7 in (5.36 m)
- Wing area: 95 sq ft (8.8 m^{2})
- Empty weight: 252 lb (114 kg)
- Gross weight: 550 lb (249 kg)
- Fuel capacity: 5 US Gallons (19 Litres)
- Powerplant: 1 × Rotax 277 , 28 hp (21 kW)
- Propellers: 2-bladed wooden

Performance

- Maximum speed: 63 mph (101 km/h, 55 kn)
- Cruise speed: 55 mph (89 km/h, 48 kn)
- Stall speed: 25 mph (40 km/h, 22 kn) flaps down
- Range: 165 mi (266 km, 143 nmi)
- Service ceiling: 14,000 ft (4,300 m)
- Rate of climb: 700 ft/min (3.6 m/s)

== See also ==
Aircraft of comparable role, configuration, and era

- Danieli Piuma
- Excalibur Aircraft Excalibur
- Quad City Challenger
- Titan Tornado
