= Phase 3 Eclipse =

American ultralight aircraft

Eclipse

General information
- Type: Ultralight aircraft
- National origin: United States
- Manufacturer: Phase 3 Aircraft
- Designer: Bruce Emmons
- Status: Production completed

History
- Introduction date: 1983

The Phase 3 Eclipse is an American ultralight aircraft that was designed by Bruce Emmons and produced by Phase 3 Aircraft. The aircraft was supplied as a kit for amateur construction.

== Design and development ==
The aircraft was designed to comply with the US FAR 103 Ultralight Vehicles rules, including the category's maximum empty weight of 254 lb (115 kg). The aircraft has a standard empty weight of 165 lb (75 kg). It features a cantilever high-wing, inverted V-tail, a single-seat, open cockpit, tricycle landing gear and a single engine in pusher configuration.

The aircraft is made from bolted-together aluminum tubing, with the flying surfaces covered in double surface Dacron sailcloth. Its elliptical planform 32.2 ft (9.8 m) span wing it mounted using several cabane struts and produces a 15:1 glide ratio. The pilot sits on an open-air seat, without a windshield. The control system is unusual in that roll control is by cable-actuated wing warping. All three landing gear wheels have suspension and the nosewheel is steerable. The 25 hp (19 kW) KFM 107 powerplant is mounted behind the pilot's seat, with the propeller in between the upper and lower tailboom tubes. The design was proof-tested to +9/-9 g. The aircraft exhibits good stability in all axes in flight and can be quickly dismantled for storage or ground transport. The wing is removed with three bolts.

The design was introduced just before the ultralight market in the US became saturated in 1984, as such it such never became a commercial success. Only a small number were completed.

== Specifications (Eclipse) ==
Data from Cliche and Virtual Ultralight Museum.

General characteristics

- Crew: one
- Length: 14 ft (4.3 m)
- Wingspan: 32.2 ft (9.8 m)
- Height: 5 ft (1.5 m)
- Wing area: 114 sq ft (10.6 m^{2})
- Empty weight: 165 lb (75 kg)
- Gross weight: 465 lb (211 kg)
- Fuel capacity: 5 U.S. gallons (19 L; 4.2 imp gal)
- Powerplant: 1 × KFM 107 twin cylinder, two-stroke, horizontally-opposed aircraft engine, with a 2:1 V-belt reduction drive, 25 hp (19 kW)
- Propellers: 2-bladed wooden, 4 ft 6 in (1.37 m) diameter with a 23 inch pitch

Performance

- Maximum speed: 63 mph (101 km/h, 55 kn)
- Cruise speed: 50 mph (80 km/h, 43 kn)
- Stall speed: 25 mph (40 km/h, 22 kn)
- Range: 150 mi (240 km, 130 nmi)
- g limits: +9/-9
- Maximum glide ratio: 15:1
