= KFM 107 =

Italian twin-cylinder aircraft engine

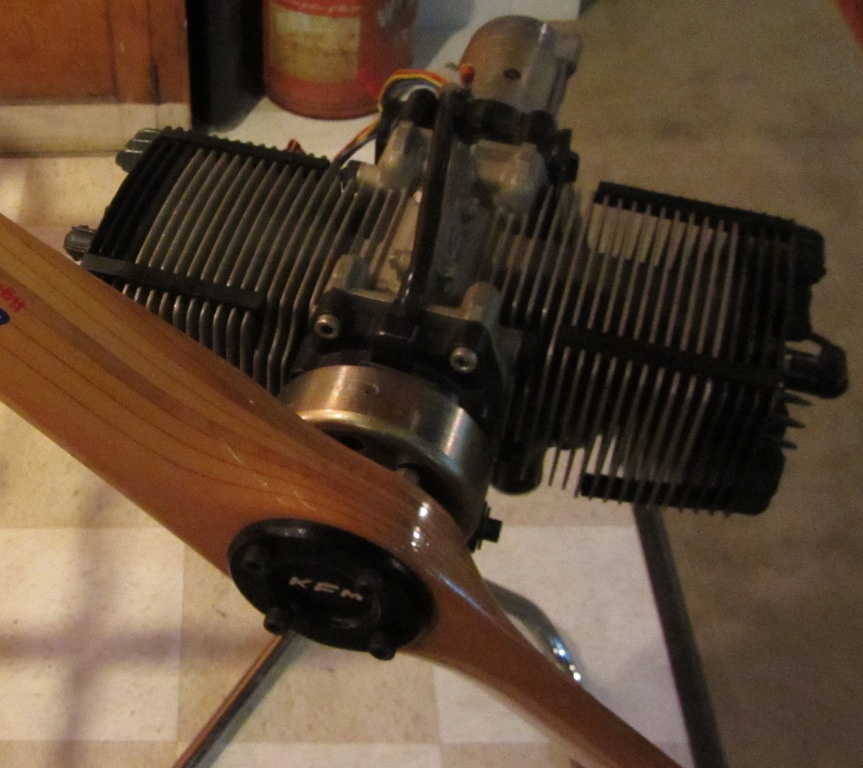
- KFM 107 engine on display
- Type: Two-stroke aircraft engine
- National origin: Italy
- Manufacturer: Italian American Motor Engineering

The KFM 107 is a two-cylinder, two-stroke, single ignition, horizontally opposed aircraft engine designed for ultralight aircraft and motor gliders.

The engine was designed and produced by the KFM (Komet Flight Motor) Aircraft Motors Division of Italian American Motor Engineering of Italy and has been out of production since 1986.

== Development ==
The KFM 107 is a conventional twin-cylinder engine that is very compact and light weight at only 15.2 kg (34 lb) in its 107s version. The engine features single capacitor discharge ignition, a single Tillotson butterfly-type carburetor, integral fuel pump, tuned exhaust system and reed valve induction. It was offered with 2:1 belt drive reduction system. Starting is electric starter or recoil starter.

Most versions of the 107 produce 25 hp (19 kW) at 6300 rpm for five minutes for take-off and 22.5 hp (17 kW) at 6080 rpm continuous.

== Variants ==
107s
"Standard" version, direct drive, recoil start, 25 hp (19 kW), weight 15.2 kg (34 lb)
107e
"Electric" version, direct drive, electric start and alternator 25 hp (19 kW), weight 19.1 kg (42 lb)
107rs
"Standard with Reduction" version, reduction drive, 25 hp (19 kW), weight 17.5 kg (39 lb)
107er
"Electric & Reduction" version, direct drive, 25 hp (19 kW), weight 21.4 kg (47 lb)
107e Maxi
Upgraded version with an OVC carburetor with fixed jets, 64 mm (2.52 in) stroke, 334 cc (20.38 cu in), 11:1 compression ratio, 2.1:1 or optional 2.55:1 reduction drive. Produces 30 hp (22 kW) at 6300 rpm for five minutes for take-off and 27 hp (20 kW) at 6080 rpm continuous.

== Applications ==
- Alpha Marco J-5
- Baker Bobcat
- Danieli Piuma
- Diehl AeroNautical XTC Hydrolight
- Latécoére 225
- Monnett Monerai P
- Monnett Moni
- Phase 3 Eclipse
- Rutan Solitaire
- Sadler Vampire

== Specifications (107s) ==
Data from Black

=== General characteristics ===
- Type: Twin-cylinder, horizontally opposed, two-stroke aircraft engine
- Bore: 60 mm (2.36 in)
- Stroke: 52 mm (2.05 in)
- Displacement: 294 cc (17.94 cu in)
- Length: 432 mm (17.01 in)
- Width: 440 mm (17.32 in)
- Height: 353 mm (13.90 in)
- Dry weight: 15.2 kg (34 lb)

=== Components ===
- Valvetrain: reed valve induction
- Oil system: premixed 4% oil and fuel
- Cooling system: air cooled
- Reduction gear: none on the "s" model

=== Performance ===
- Power output: 25 hp (19 kW) at 6300 rpm for five minutes for take-off, 22.5 hp (17 kW) at 6080 rpm continuous
- Compression ratio: 10.5:1

== See also ==
- KFM 112M
- Hirth F30
- Rotax 277
