= Diehl AeroNautical XTC Hydrolight =

American ultralight aircraft

XTC Hydrolight

General information
- Type: Ultralight aircraft
- National origin: United States
- Manufacturer: Diehl AeroNautical
- Status: Production completed

History
- Introduction date: 1983
- First flight: March 1982

The Diehl AeroNautical XTC Hydrolight is an American amphibious flying boat ultralight aircraft that was designed and produced by Diehl AeroNautical in the 1980s. The prototype first flew in March 1982, with production of kits commencing the following year.

== Design and development ==
The XTC was the first amphibious flying boat to comply with the US FAR 103 Ultralight Vehicles rules, including the category's maximum empty weight of 254 lb (115 kg). The aircraft has a standard empty weight of 247 lb (112 kg). It features a cantilever mid-wing, a canard foreplane, dual vertical tails, a single-seat, open cockpit, re-positionable tricycle landing gear and a single engine in pusher configuration.

The aircraft's hull is made from fiberglass, while the wing has a Kevlar-epoxy spar with its flying surfaces covered in bonded Mylar. Its 32 ft (9.8 m) span wing is located behind the cockpit. Some aircraft were delivered with optional enclosed bubble cockpits for all-weather flying. The landing gear repositions clear of the hull for water landings and is sprung on all three wheels. The nose wheel is steerable. The control system is three-axis, with the canard for pitch, twin rudders for yaw and spoilers for roll control. The XTC is very aerodynamically clean and produces a 14:1 glide ratio. Strongly built, the aircraft is rated for +8/-8g.

The standard engine supplied was the twin-cylinder, two-stroke, single ignition, horizontally opposed KFM 107 aircraft engine of 25 hp (19 kW).

== Operational history ==
In service many owners replaced the KFM 107 powerplant, as it left the aircraft underpowered, especially for water operations. Owners report that the XTC is pitch sensitive in flight.

== Specifications (XTC) ==
Data from Cliche

General characteristics

- Crew: one
- Wingspan: 32 ft (9.8 m)
- Wing area: 155 sq ft (14.4 m^{2})
- Empty weight: 247 lb (112 kg)
- Gross weight: 500 lb (227 kg)
- Fuel capacity: 5 U.S. gallons (19 L; 4.2 imp gal)
- Powerplant: 1 × KFM 107 twin-cylinder, two-stroke, single ignition, horizontally opposed aircraft engine, 25 hp (19 kW)

Performance

- Maximum speed: 62 mph (100 km/h, 54 kn)
- Cruise speed: 50 mph (80 km/h, 43 kn)
- Stall speed: 25 mph (40 km/h, 22 kn)
- Range: 120 mi (190 km, 100 nmi)
- g limits: +8/-8
- Maximum glide ratio: 14:1
- Rate of climb: 600 ft/min (3.0 m/s)
