= Danieli Piuma =

Italian motorglider

Piuma

General information
- Type: Motor glider
- National origin: Italy
- Designer: Tiziano Danieli
- Status: Plans available
- Number built: 13 (all models 2003)

History
- Introduction date: 1990
- First flight: 1990

The Danieli Piuma (English: feather) is a family of Italian high-wing, strut-braced, pusher configuration single-seat motor gliders that was designed by Tiziano Danieli of Schio and supplied as plans for amateur construction.

== Design and development ==
The Piuma was designed to be an inexpensive, easy-to-fly and easy-to-build ultralight motor glider. The first model was initially just called the Piuma, but as other models were developed it became known as the Piuma Original.

The Piuma is constructed from wood and finished with doped fabric. The semi-tapered 11.89 m (39.0 ft) span wing is supported by a single lift strut on each side and has air brakes. The engine is mounted behind the cockpit. The specified engine is the 22 kW (30 hp) KFM 107er, but engines of 15 to 22 kW (20 to 30 hp) can be fitted. The landing gear is of tricycle configuration and made from steel with rubber shock-absorbers, with an auxiliary tailwheel and fits wheel pants to reduce drag. The tail is cruciform. The aircraft has a glide ratio of 17:1 at 64 km/h (40 mph). Cabin width is 58 cm (23 in)

The designer estimated that it would take a builder 1000 hours to complete the aircraft from the plans. The plans cost US$220 in 1998 and included a 30-page construction manual.

== Variants ==
Piuma Original
Initial version with 11.89 m (39.0 ft) span wing, first flown in 1990. Eight reported completed in 2003.
Piuma E
Improved model with glide ratio of 20:1 at 71 km/h (44 mph) and other refinements.
Piuma Evolution
Improved model with a wider cockpit, more streamlined fuselage, redesigned tail, new lift struts, electrically retractable nose wheel. main landing gear made from a wood/fibreglass sandwich and a more reclined seat. Four reported completed in 2003.
Piuma Tourer
Model optimized for cross country powered flight with shorter wing of 10.39 m (34.1 ft) and a NACA 4415 airfoil used in the rectangular portion of the wing and a NACA 2R1-12 airfoil in the tapered wing tip. Cruises at 135 km/h (84 mph) and has a 10:1 glide ratio. One reported completed in 2003.
Piuma Twin Evolution
Two seat model with side-by-side configuration seating, introduced in 1998 and inspired by the Tourer. The recommended engine is the Rotax 503 of 37 kW (50 hp).

== Specifications (Piuma Original) ==
Data from Purdy and Danieli

General characteristics

- Crew: one
- Length: 6.00 m (19.70 ft)
- Wingspan: 11.89 m (39.00 ft)
- Wing area: 11.61 m^{2} (125.0 sq ft)
- Aspect ratio: 11:1
- Airfoil: Rhode St. Genese 36
- Empty weight: 145 kg (320 lb)
- Gross weight: 240 kg (530 lb)
- Fuel capacity: 15 litres (3.3 imp gal; 4.0 US gal)
- Powerplant: 1 × KFM 107er two-cylinder, two-stroke, single ignition, horizontally opposed aircraft engine, 22 kW (30 hp)
- Propellers: 2-bladed wooden

Performance

- Maximum speed: 100 km/h (62 mph, 54 kn)
- Cruise speed: 80 km/h (50 mph, 43 kn)
- Stall speed: 48 km/h (30 mph, 26 kn)
- Range: 400 km (250 mi, 220 nmi)
- Service ceiling: 3,000 m (10,000 ft)
- Maximum glide ratio: 17:1 at 64 km/h (40 mph)
- Rate of sink: 2.5 m/s (500 ft/min)
- Wing loading: 20.7 kg/m^{2} (4.24 lb/sq ft)

== See also ==
- List of gliders

Aircraft of comparable role, configuration, and era

- Earthstar Soaring Gull
- Quad City Challenger
