= US Light Aircraft Hornet =

Ultralight kit aircraft

General information
- Type: Kit aircraft
- National origin: United States
- Manufacturer: US Light Aircraft Corporation; Higher Class Aviation; Oklahoma Light Aircraft
- Designer: Jim Millett
- Status: Production completed
- Number built: 45 (2003)

History
- Manufactured: 1994-circa 2008
- Introduction date: 1994
- First flight: 1993

The US Light Aircraft Hornet is an American two-seats-in-tandem, pusher configuration, tricycle gear, strut-braced high wing ultralight aircraft, that was produced US Light Aircraft Corporation of Ramona, California between 1994 and circa 2008 in kit form for amateur construction. It was also available as a factory-completed light-sport aircraft.

After US Light Aircraft ceased production the design was taken up by Higher Class Aviation and then later Oklahoma Light Aircraft of Blackwell, Oklahoma, which reportedly had the Hornet in production in 2011. By July 2012 Oklahoma Light Aircraft's website had been removed from the internet and the aircraft was no longer advertised as being for sale.

== Design and development ==
The Hornet was first introduced at Sun 'n Fun in 1994. Externally the aircraft greatly resembles the Quad City Challenger II, but internally the structure is very different. When it was available the Hornet was priced considerably higher than the Challenger II.

The Hornet structure is built up from aluminium tubing, riveted together with gussets. The aircraft is then covered with doped aircraft fabric. The Hornet's wing incorporates dual bridge-section spars, with a single strut and V-jury struts. The wing was sandbag-tested to 7g without failure. The aircraft includes electric flaps and trim, dual controls and two wing-mounted fuel tanks. The landing gear incorporates pneumatic suspension on all three wheels, including the steerable nosewheel, and hydraulic brakes on the mainwheels. The Hornet can also be equipped with floats or skis. Early production aircraft experienced elevator flutter at speeds in excess of 100 mph (161 km/h) but this was addressed by mass-balancing the elevator.

Reported construction times from the kit are 250–300 hours.

== Operational history ==
The Hornet won Grand Champion Light Plane at both Sun 'n Fun and AirVenture in 1995.

== Variants ==
Hornet
Base model, powered by a 55 hp (41 kW) Hirth 2703, or optionally the 65 hp (48 kW) Hirth 2706 engine.
Super Hornet
Light sport model, fully assembled and powered by an 80 hp (60 kW) Rotax 912UL or optionally the 100 hp (75 kW) Rotax 912ULS engine

== Specifications (Hornet) ==
Data from Cliche and Kitplanes

General characteristics

- Crew: one
- Capacity: one passenger
- Length: 20 ft 0 in (6.10 m)
- Wingspan: 27 ft 6 in (8.38 m)
- Height: 6 ft 0 in (1.83 m)
- Wing area: 137 sq ft (12.7 m^{2})
- Empty weight: 475 lb (215 kg)
- Gross weight: 1,000 lb (454 kg)
- Fuel capacity: 10 US gallons (38 litres)
- Powerplant: 1 × Hirth 2703 , 55 hp (41 kW)

Performance

- Maximum speed: 120 mph (190 km/h, 100 kn)
- Cruise speed: 80 mph (130 km/h, 70 kn)
- Stall speed: 35 mph (56 km/h, 30 kn)
- Never exceed speed: 140 mph (230 km/h, 120 kn)
- Range: 400 mi (640 km, 350 nmi) with auxiliary fuel tanks
- Service ceiling: 12,000 ft (3,700 m)
- g limits: +4
- Maximum glide ratio: 9:1
- Rate of climb: 800 ft/min (4.1 m/s)
- Wing loading: 7.30 lb/sq ft (35.6 kg/m^{2})

== See also ==
Aircraft of comparable role, configuration, and era

- Excalibur Aircraft Excalibur
- Quad City Challenger
