= CGS Hawk =

Family of ultralight aircraft

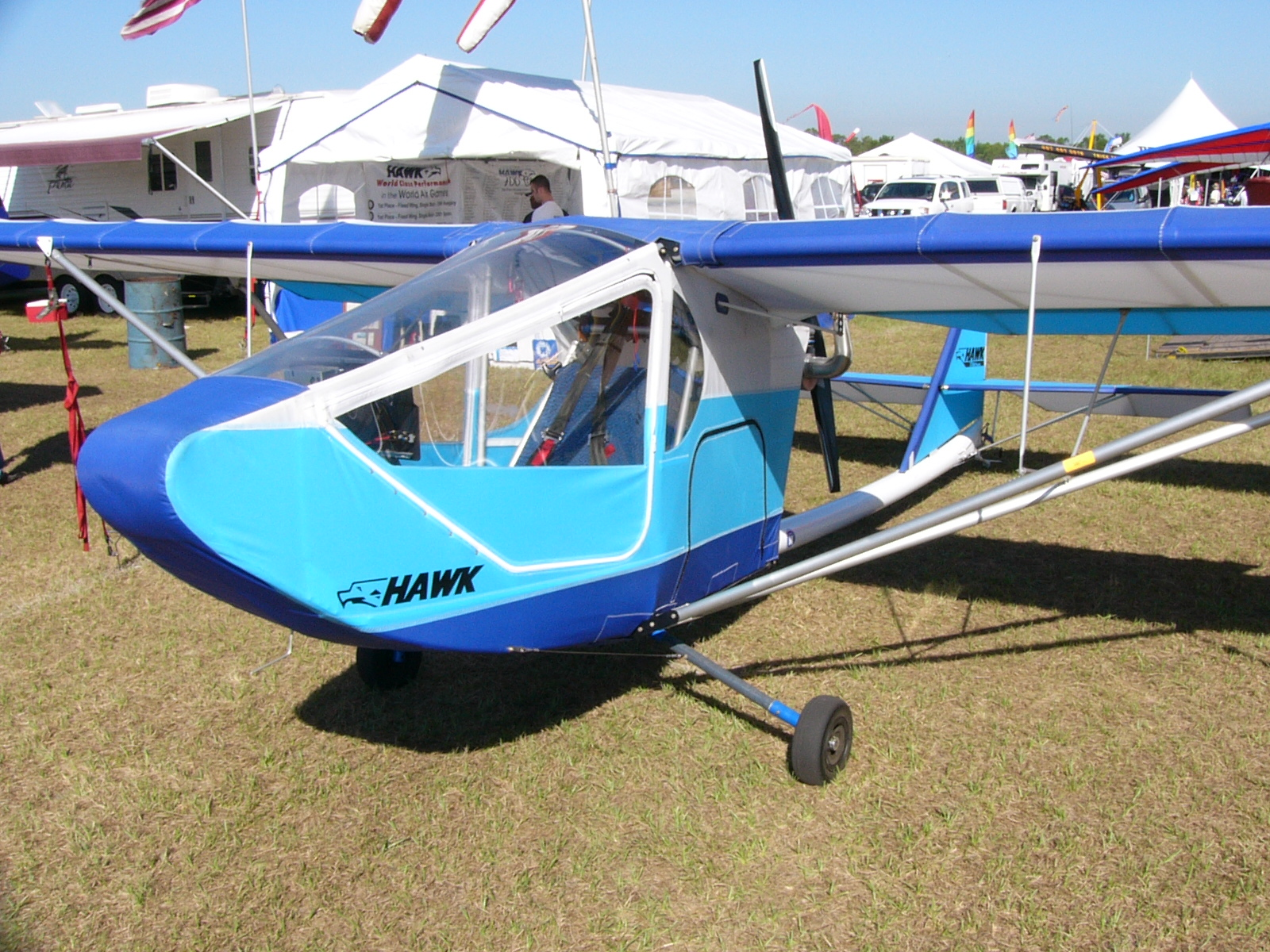
- Hawk Ultra

General information
- Type: Light-sport aircraft, Homebuilt aircraft, ultralight aircraft
- National origin: United States
- Manufacturer: CGS Aviation
- Designer: Chuck Slusarczyk
- Status: In production
- Number built: 1712

History
- Introduction date: March 1982
- First flight: January 1982

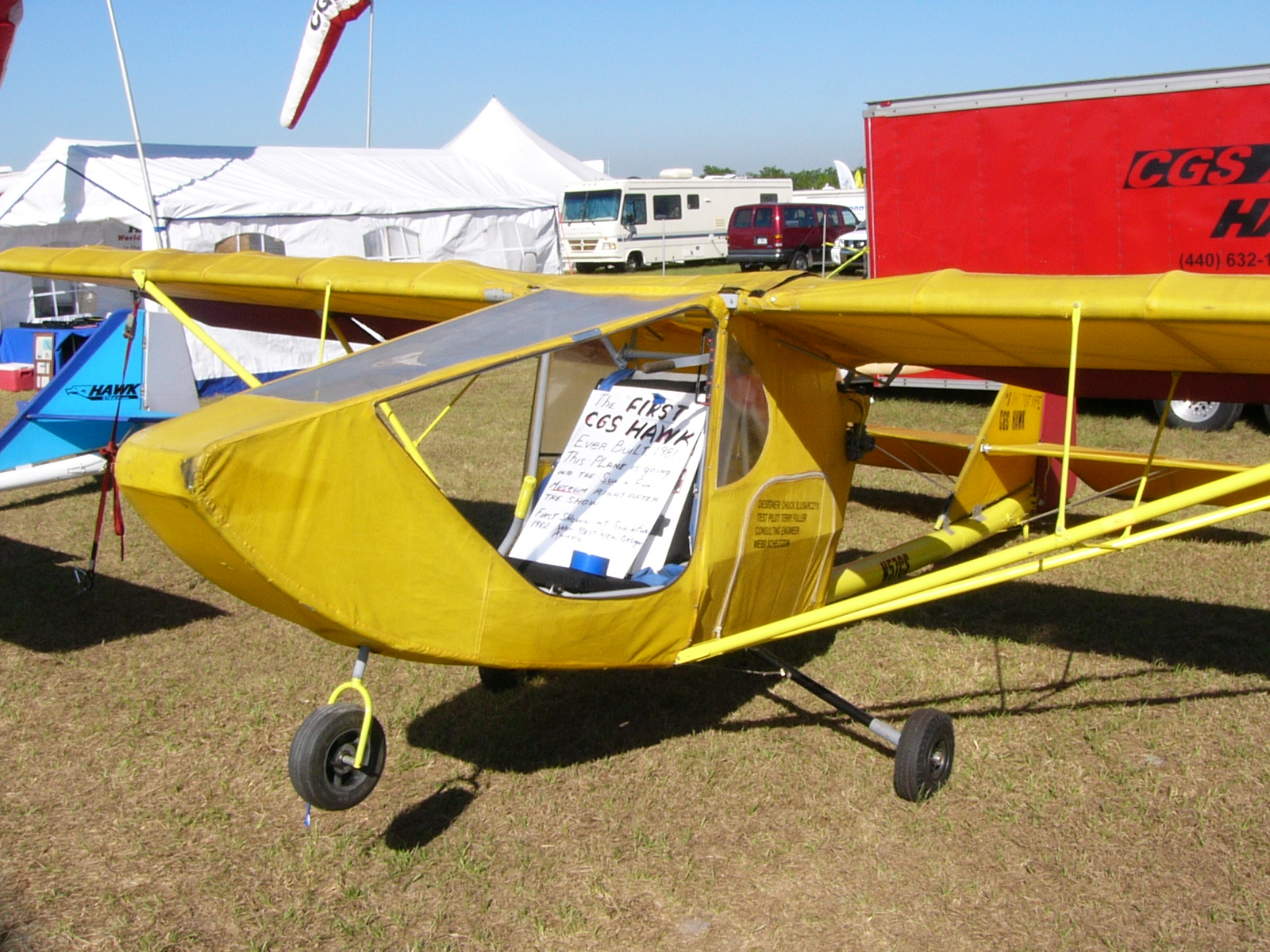
The first Hawk prototype at Sun 'n Fun 2006

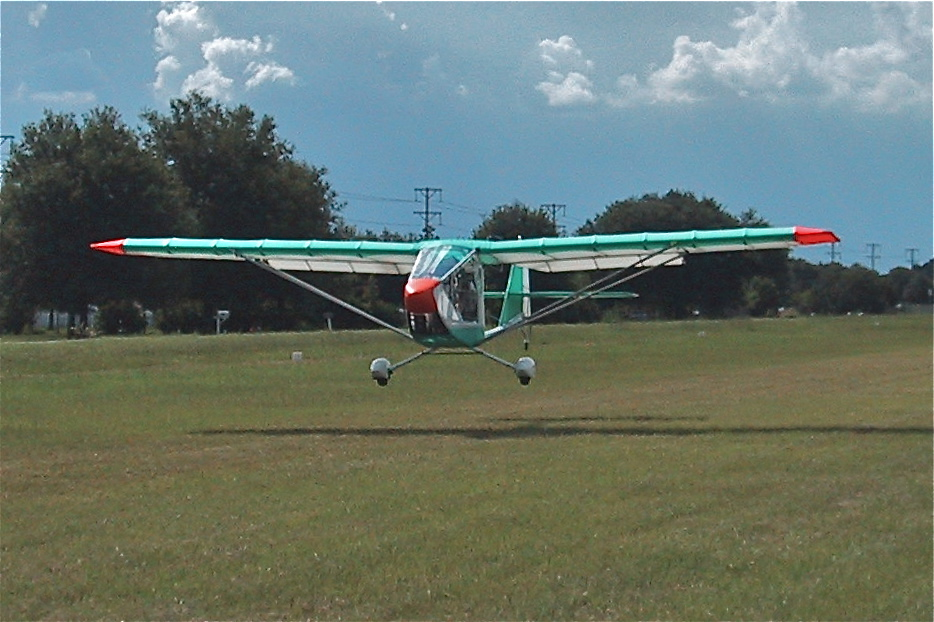
Hawk Sport

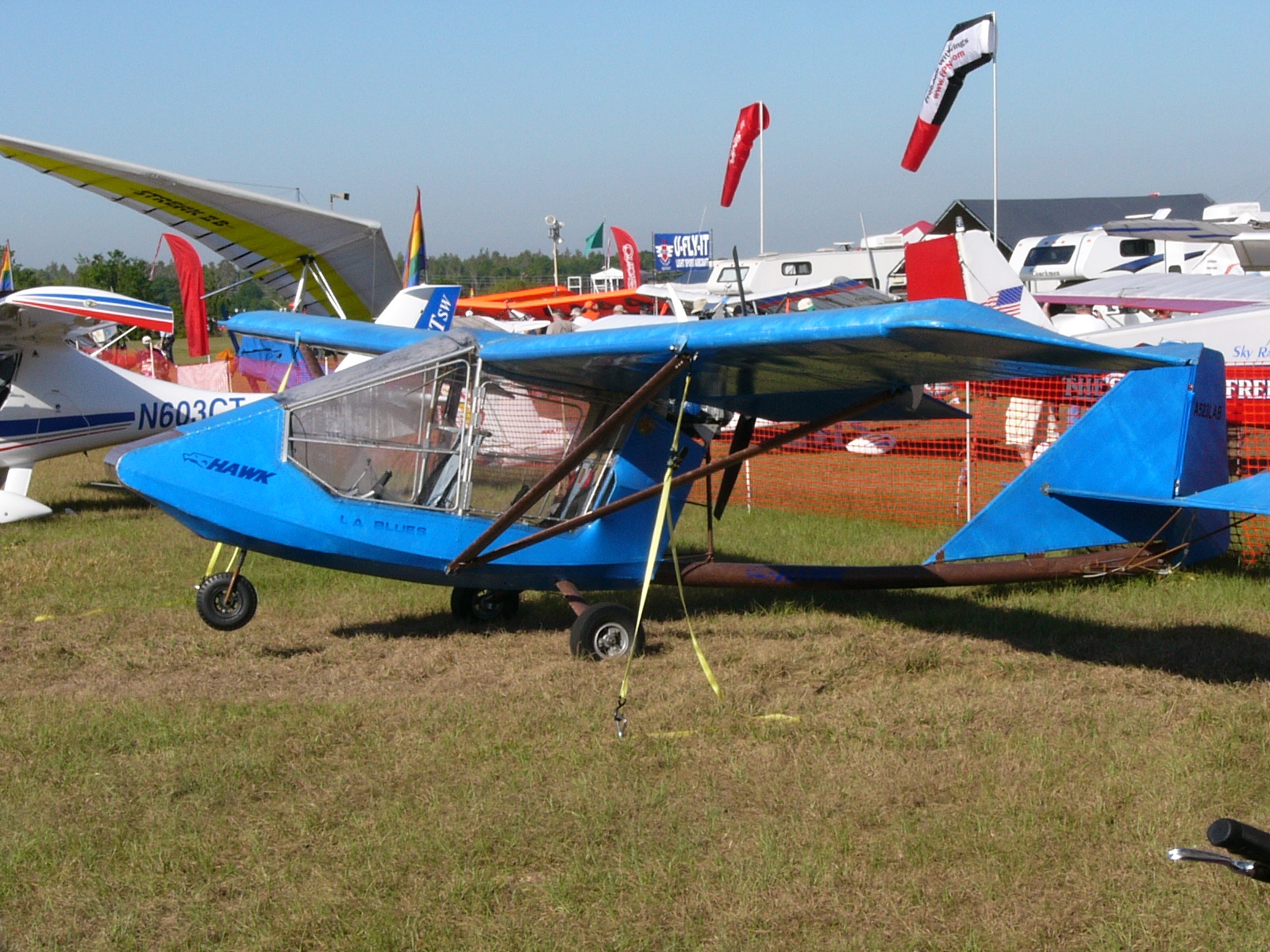
Hawk Arrow II with dope and fabric covering

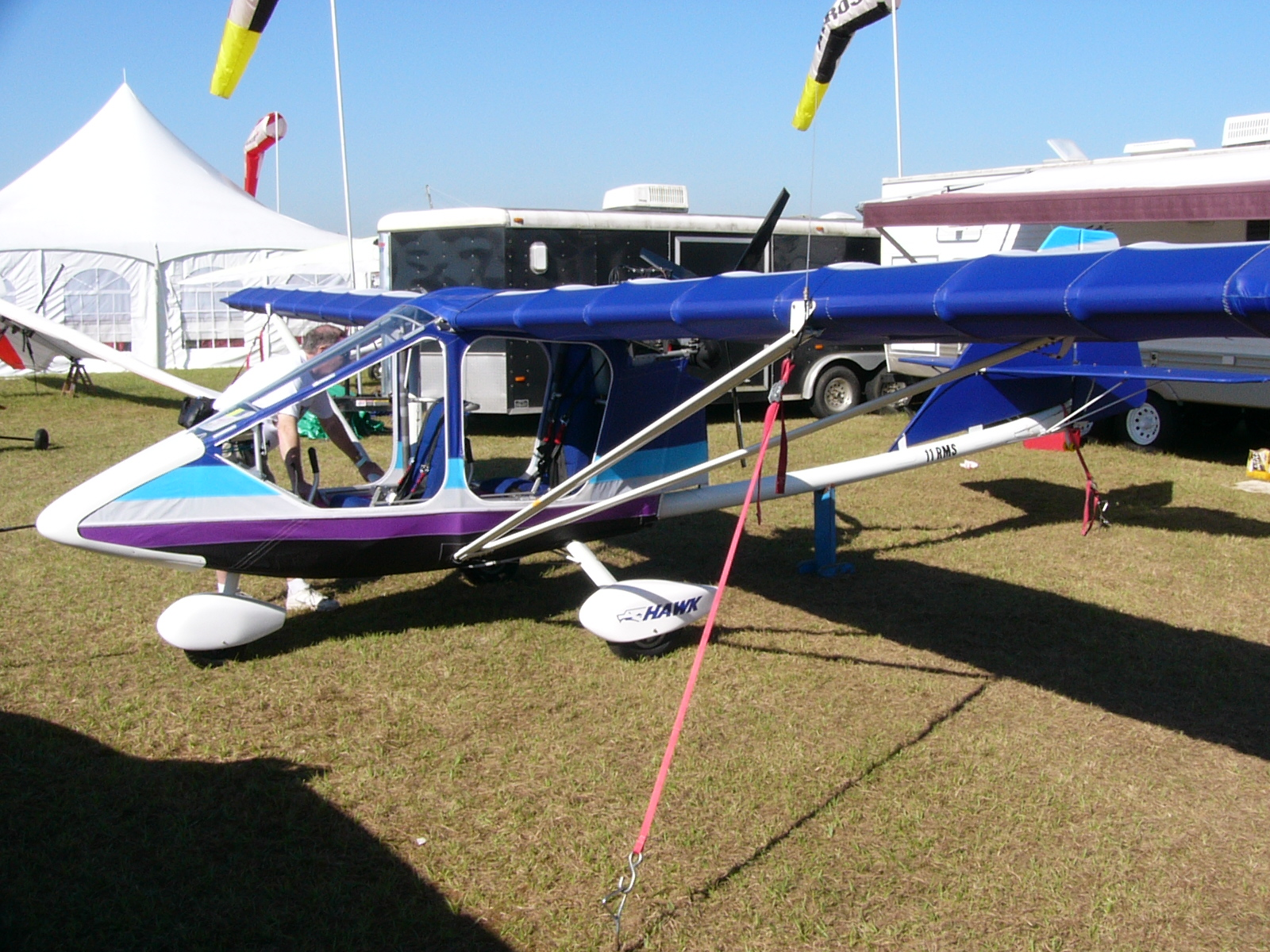
Hawk Arrow II

The CGS Hawk is a family of high wing, strut-braced, pusher configuration, single and two-seats-in-tandem ultralight aircraft, designed by Chuck Slusarczyk and manufactured by CGS Aviation.

== Development ==
Designer Chuck Slusarczyk established himself as a hang glider designer in the early 1970s, including producing engine power units for hang gliders. In October 1979, his company, Chuck's Glider Supplies was renamed CGS Aviation. In 1980 Slusarczyk surveyed pilots at Sun 'n Fun and AirVenture to find out what they wanted in a new ultralight aircraft design. The survey revealed pilots were looking for:

- an enclosed cockpit with removable doors
- three-axis controls
- flaps and not flaperons
- struts in place of cable-bracing
- the choice of tricycle gear, with a steerable nose wheel or conventional landing gear, with a steerable tail wheel
- pusher configuration

When the resulting Hawk first flew in January 1982 it was the first ultralight aircraft with an enclosed cockpit and to use strut bracing. The aircraft was intended to meet the requirements of the US FAR 103 Ultralight Vehicles category, including that category's maximum 254 lb (115 kg) empty weight.

The Hawk wing is strut-braced, constructed from aluminum tubing and covered with either pre-sewn Dacron envelopes or doped aircraft fabric. The flat-bottomed wing also features flaps. The fuselage is of similar construction and uses a curved boom tube for its main structural member. The curved tube allows the tail to be located higher, out of the wing's downwash, especially when the flaps are extended. Landing gear for all models is optionally tricycle or conventional.

The Hawks are available as aircraft kits, quick-build kits, or completed aircraft.

== Operational history ==
The Hawk was introduced to the public at Sun N Fun in March 1982 in Lakeland, Florida. The prototype won Best New Design for 1982.

At the EAA Convention held in Oshkosh, Wisconsin that same year the Hawk was named Outstanding New Design and also Reserve Grand Champion.

At Oshkosh 1983, the Hawk won the Dupont Kevlar Air Recreational Vehicle Design Competition against more than 126 other designs.

== Variants ==
=== Single seaters ===
Hawk Classic
Single seat, original design, introduced in 1982 and still in production. 990 flying in 2011. Standard empty weight 310 lb (141 kg) with a 600 lb (272 kg) gross weight.. Engines available include the two-stroke 40 hp (30 kW) Rotax 447, 52 hp (39 kW) Rotax 503, 65 hp (48 kW) Rotax 582, 40 hp (30 kW) Hirth 2702, 55 hp (41 kW) Hirth 3202, 65 hp (48 kW) Hirth 3203 and the four-stroke 60 hp (45 kW) HKS 700E.

Hawk Arrow
Single seat, with a less sloped windshield, longer nose, larger tail surfaces, flatter floor and reinforced tail boom. 135 flying in 2011. Standard empty weight 330 lb (150 kg) with a 625 lb (283 kg) gross weight. Engines available include the two-stroke 40 hp (30 kW) Rotax 447, 52 hp (39 kW) Rotax 503, 65 hp (48 kW) Rotax 582, 40 hp (30 kW) Hirth 2702, 55 hp (41 kW) Hirth 3202, 65 hp (48 kW) Hirth 3203 and the four-stroke 60 hp (45 kW) HKS 700E.

Hawk Plus
Single seat, based on the Arrow two-seater, with only the front seat fitted, intended as a freight carrier. 65 flying in 2011. Standard empty weight 350 lb (159 kg) with an 800 lb (363 kg) gross weight. Engines available include the two-stroke 40 hp (30 kW) Rotax 447, 52 hp (39 kW) Rotax 503, 65 hp (48 kW) Rotax 582, 40 hp (30 kW) Hirth 2702, 55 hp (41 kW) Hirth 3202, 65 hp (48 kW) Hirth 3203 and the four-stroke 60 hp (45 kW) HKS 700E.

Hawk Sport
Single seat, developed to compete in the 1999 European World Air Games. Eight were flying by 2011. It has competition features, including streamlined struts and landing gear legs, no jury struts, a semi-symmetrical airfoil and 3 in (8 cm) extra headroom. Standard empty weight 310 lb (141 kg) with a 625 lb (283 kg) gross weight. Engines available include the two-stroke 40 hp (30 kW) Rotax 447, 52 hp (39 kW) Rotax 503, 65 hp (48 kW) Rotax 582 or the 40 hp (30 kW) Hirth 2702.

Hawk Ultra
Single seat, based on the Classic. The Classic weighed under 254 lb (115 kg) when introduced, but became heavier as amenities were added and thus no longer qualified for FAR 103. The Ultra model is a lightened version to comply with the FAR 103 rules. Eight flying in 2011. Standard empty weight 254 lb (115 kg) with a 600 lb (272 kg) gross weight. Engines available include the two-stroke 40 hp (30 kW) Rotax 447 or the 35 hp (26 kW) Kawasaki 440.

AG-Hawk
No longer in production. 30 reported flying in 1998. Single seat, based on the Arrow and equipped as an agricultural aircraft for spraying. Standard empty weight 275 lb (125 kg) with an 800 lb (363 kg) gross weight. Specified engine was the two-stroke 65 hp (48 kW) Rotax 582.

=== Two seaters ===
Hawk Classic II
Introduced in 1985 and no longer in production. 290 reported flying in 1998. Two seats in tandem, based on the Classic. Standard empty weight 340 lb (154 kg) with an 800 lb (363 kg) gross weight. Engines available included the two-stroke, 52 hp (39 kW) Rotax 503, 65 hp (48 kW) Rotax 582, 55 hp (41 kW) Hirth 2703 and the 65 hp (48 kW) Hirth 2706.

Hawk Arrow II
Two seats in tandem, with the rear seat raised for visibility. Based on the Classic, but with a less sloped windshield, longer nose, larger tail surfaces, flatter floor and reinforced tail boom. Available as a fully assembled US Special Light Sport Aircraft. It incorporates the semi-symmetrical airfoil and streamlined extruded aluminum wing struts from the Hawk Sport. 186 flying in 2011. Standard empty weight 420 lb (191 kg) with a 950 lb (431 kg) gross weight. Engines available include the two-stroke, 52 hp (39 kW) Rotax 503, 65 hp (48 kW) Rotax 582, 55 hp (41 kW) Hirth 3202, 65 hp (48 kW) Hirth 3203, 80 hp (60 kW) Hirth F30, 100 hp (75 kW) Hirth 3701 and the four-stroke 60 hp (45 kW) HKS 700E.

== Specifications (Classic) ==
Data from CGS & Kitplanes

General characteristics

- Crew: one
- Length: 20 ft 7 in (6.27 m)
- Wingspan: 28 ft 10 in (8.79 m)
- Height: 4 ft 6 in (1.37 m)
- Wing area: 135 sq ft (12.5 m^{2})
- Empty weight: 310 lb (141 kg)
- Gross weight: 600 lb (272 kg)
- Fuel capacity: 5 US gallons (19 litres)
- Powerplant: 1 × Rotax 447 two-stroke twin-cylinder aircraft engine, 40 hp (30 kW)

Performance

- Cruise speed: 75 mph (121 km/h, 65 kn)
- Stall speed: 35 mph (56 km/h, 30 kn)
- Never exceed speed: 100 mph (160 km/h, 87 kn)
- Range: 170 mi (280 km, 150 nmi)
- Service ceiling: 12,500 ft (3,800 m)
- Rate of climb: 800 ft/min (4.1 m/s)

== See also ==
Aircraft of comparable role, configuration, and era

- Aero-Works Aerolite 103
- Beaujon Mach .07
- Beaujon Enduro
- Birdman WT-11 Chinook
- ISON Airbike
- Spectrum RX-28 Beaver
