= Saab Training and Simulation =

Saab Training and Simulation is a company with its headquarters in Huskvarna, Sweden.

It is a subsidiary of Saab AB that produces military and security training systems. For the army market they provide target equipment for military training, mobile data communication systems, laser simulator systems and combat training systems. For the air force market they provide support.

Saab Training Systems has about 400 employees and subsidiaries in Czech Republic (about 120 employees), USA, UK, Germany, Norway, Finland, the Netherlands and Canada. The company exports to nearly 20 countries and the export is almost 95% of its profitability.

Saab Training and Simulation used to be known as Saab Training Systems AB.

== Training ==
- Precision gunnery and skills training
- Tactical training
- Live fire training
- Urban operations training

Tactical training is the most complex of the categories because the entire session is recorded on a computer. When a soldier participates in a training session, he/she wears a vest with small loudspeakers, a radio antenna and built in GPS. The helmet has laser detectors and reflectors. Via a radio network the GPS is able to send location information to the tablet and the commander. The commander then can supervise the movements of the troops. The commander can also give commands to soldiers via a Saab-developed Radio Communications system called DAN (data acquisition network.)

== Simulation and training ==
- .50 Cal Trainer, Advanced
- After Action Review Pro
- AT4 Trainer
- Armor Target Systems
- BT 46 Laser Simulator
- BT 46 Mk II
- Carl-Gustaf Trainer
- CLS (Contractor Logistical Support)
- COS (Contractor Operational Support)
- DITS - Deployable Instrumented Training System
- ExPERT
- ExTerm
- GAMER Manpack
- Helicopter Firing System
- Infantry Soldiers Accessories
- JAVWES – a full-spectrum fire-and-forget trainer
- Logistic & Support Services
- MILES Interface
- Observer/Controller PDA Software
- PDD - Personnel Detection Device
- Precision Gunnery Training System
- Range Control Systems
- Small Arms Transmitter – SAT
- Tactical Urban Training
- Universal Target System
- Virtual simulators (E-COM)
