= Hirth =

Engine manufacturer based in Benningen, Germany

Hirth Engines GmbH
- Industry: Aerospace
- Founded: 1920
- Founder: Hellmuth Hirth
- Products: Aircraft engines
- Owner: Hans Göbler
- Website: hirthengines.com

Hirth Engines GmbH is an engine manufacturer based in Benningen, Germany. It is currently a part of the UMS Aero Group. Hirth began manufacturing aero engines in the 1920s, was taken over by Heinkel in WWII to develop the Heinkel-Hirth jet engines, and today specialises in small two-stroke engines for light aircraft and other applications.

== History ==
=== Hellmuth Hirth and Hirth Motoren ===
The company was founded by Hellmuth Hirth as Versuchsbau Hellmuth Hirth. The first commercial engine, the 4-cylinder inverted in-line HM 60, first ran in June 1923 and was sold from the next year. Its quality was extremely high and it formed the foundation of the business.

The company was renamed Leichtmetall-Werke GmbH, Elektronmetall GmbH and eventually separated from the aero engine manufacturing to form Mahle GmbH as a manufacturer of light alloy engine components, specifically the magnesium alloy Elektron, including parts for aircraft engines.

In 1931, Hirth renamed the much-expanded aero engine business as Hirth Motoren GmbH. An upgrade in the form of the HM 60R improved efficiency, and was followed by 6, 8 and 12-cylinder versions based on the same basic design. Over the next decade, Hirth became one of Germany's leading aero engine manufacturers.

=== Heinkel-Hirth ===
During the late 1930s Hans von Ohain developed a jet engine design while at Göttingen University. Despite having no engine facility, aircraft designer Heinkel employed him to continue his work. Together with Wilhelm Gundermann he developed a series of experimental engines, including the HeS 3B which powered the world's first jet aircraft, the Heinkel He 178, in 1939.

Hellmuth Hirth died in an aircraft crash in 1938. The RLM or Reichsluftfahrtministerium ("Reich aviation ministry") nationalised his company, and in 1942 it was taken over by Heinkel to form Heinkel-Hirth. While the existing piston engine series were continued, Heinkel also used the Hirth facilities for development work on their series of jet engines. Although Heinkel-Hirth had some technical success with this programme, their jet engines were not put into production.

=== Gobler-Hirth and UMS Skeldar ===
Following World War II, Hirth re-emerged as an independent company once again. Because of the prohibitions on German aviation in this period, Hirth manufactured small marine and stationary engines, as well as motors for snowmobiles. In the early 1970s the company went into voluntary liquidation.

The company was acquired by Hans Göbler, who continued making small two-stroke engines under the name of Gobler-Hirth Motoren Gmbh, and re-introduced aero engines to the range. In 2011 Gobler-Hirth were developing UAV piston engines to run on heavier jet fuel, because of its higher energy density and ease of handling.

In 2018 Gobler-Hirth was taken over by UMS Skeldar, a joint venture between the Swedish aerospace company Saab AB and Swiss drone maker UMS Aero Group in which UMS hold a majority share. The company was renamed Hirth Engines Gmbh. The Skeldar range of UAVs, originally developed by Saab, have introduced Hirth's heavy-fuel piston engines to the marketplace, alongside their established gasoline-fuelled products.

== Engines ==
=== Four-stroke piston (prewar and WWII) ===
- Hirth HM 60 - 4-cylinder inverted air-cooled inline aircraft engine, 80 hp (60 kW)
- Hirth HM 500 - 4-cylinder air-cooled inverted inline,
- Hirth HM 501 - 4-cylinder air-cooled inverted inline,
- Hirth HM 504 - 4-cylinder air-cooled inverted inline, 105 hp (78 kW)
- Hirth HM 506 - 6-cylinder air-cooled inverted inline, 165 hp (123 kW)
- Hirth HM 508 - 8-cylinder air-cooled inverted-V, 280 hp (209 kW)
- Hirth HM 512 - 12-cylinder air-cooled inverted-V, 400 hp (298 kW)
- Hirth HM 515 - 4-cylinder air-cooled inverted inline, 60 hp (45 kW)

=== Turbine (prewar and WWII) ===
- Heinkel HeS 1 - Bench-test prototype engine fuelled by hydrogen, run some five months after the first Whittle bench-test prototype.
- Heinkel HeS 3 - First jet engine to fly.
- Heinkel-Hirth HeS 30 - aka 006.
- Heinkel-Hirth HeS 40 - "constant volume" combustion engine.
- Heinkel-Hirth HeS 50 - ducted-fan unit for long-duration flight.
- Heinkel-Hirth HeS 60 - HeS 50 with an additional turbine stage.
- Heinkel-Hirth HeS 011 - advanced twin-spool design, 19 test examples built.

=== Two-stroke piston (postwar) ===
- Hirth F-23 - 2-cylinder two stroke 50 hp (37 kW)
- Hirth F-30 - 4-cylinder two stroke 110 hp (82 kW)
- Hirth F-33 - 1-cylinder two stroke 28 hp (21 kW)
- Hirth F-36 - 1-cylinder two stroke 15 hp (11 kW)
- Hirth F-40 - 4-cylinder two stroke 120 hp (89 kW)
- Hirth F-102 - 2-cylinder two stroke 26 hp (19 kW)
- Hirth F-263 - 2-cylinder two stroke 31 hp (23 kW)
- Hirth 2702 - 2-cylinder two stroke 40 hp (30 kW)
- Hirth 2703 - 2-cylinder two stroke 55 hp (41 kW)
- Hirth 2704 - 2-cylinder two stroke 53 hp (40 kW)
- Hirth 2706 - 2-cylinder two stroke 65 hp (48 kW)
- Hirth 3002 - 4-cylinder two stroke 83 hp (62 kW)
- Hirth 3202 - 2-cylinder two stroke 55 hp (41 kW)
- Hirth 3203 - 2-cylinder two stroke 65 hp (48 kW)
- Hirth 3502 - 2-cylinder two stroke 60 hp (45 kW)
- Hirth 3503 - 2-cylinder two stroke 70 hp (52 kW)
- Hirth 3701 - 3-cylinder two stroke 100 hp (75 kW)

== See also ==
- List of aircraft engine manufacturers
