= GAMER Manpack =

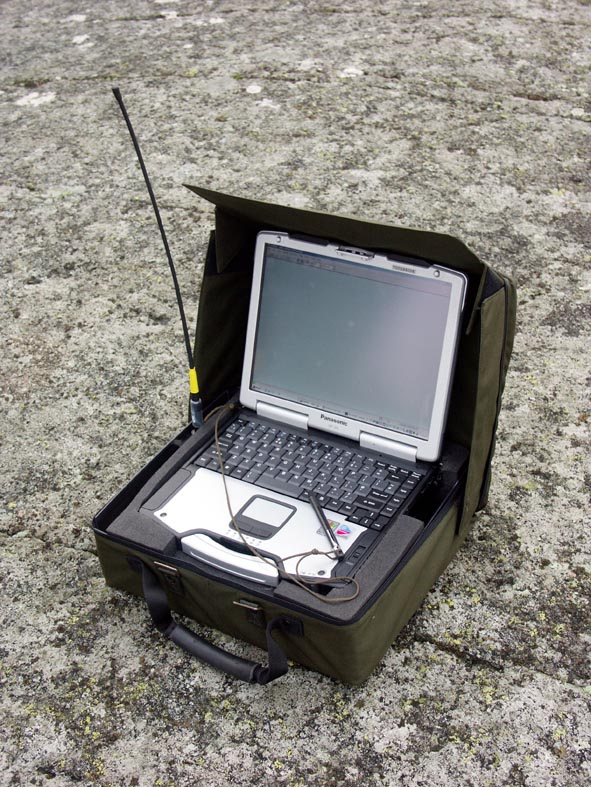
GAMER Manpack

Saab’s GAMER Manpack is used in smaller military exercises when the instructor wants to have control of the exercise and at the same time be able to be near the action. The actual GAMER Manpack consists of a miniaturised radio base station and a laptop with an exercise-command-and-control system. These are small enough to be carried around in a backpack.

The instructor decides through the system what is to happen in the exercise, this is communicated through the radio. Information about what is happening during the exercise is sent back to the system through specific vests the soldiers are wearing (Personnel Detection Devices (PDD's)). In this way it is possible to control simulated minefields, indirect fires and simulated bombs.

The instructor then follows how each soldier acts as an individual and a member of the group. This movement is also saved and the information is then saved to be used in the evaluation of the exercise.

The system is used by the South African National Defence Force.

GAMER Manpack can also be used in civil training. For example, in 2009 the UK Ministry of Defence Police purchased three GAMER Manpacks and related products to be used in their training.
