= Elektron (alloy) =

Range of magnesium alloys

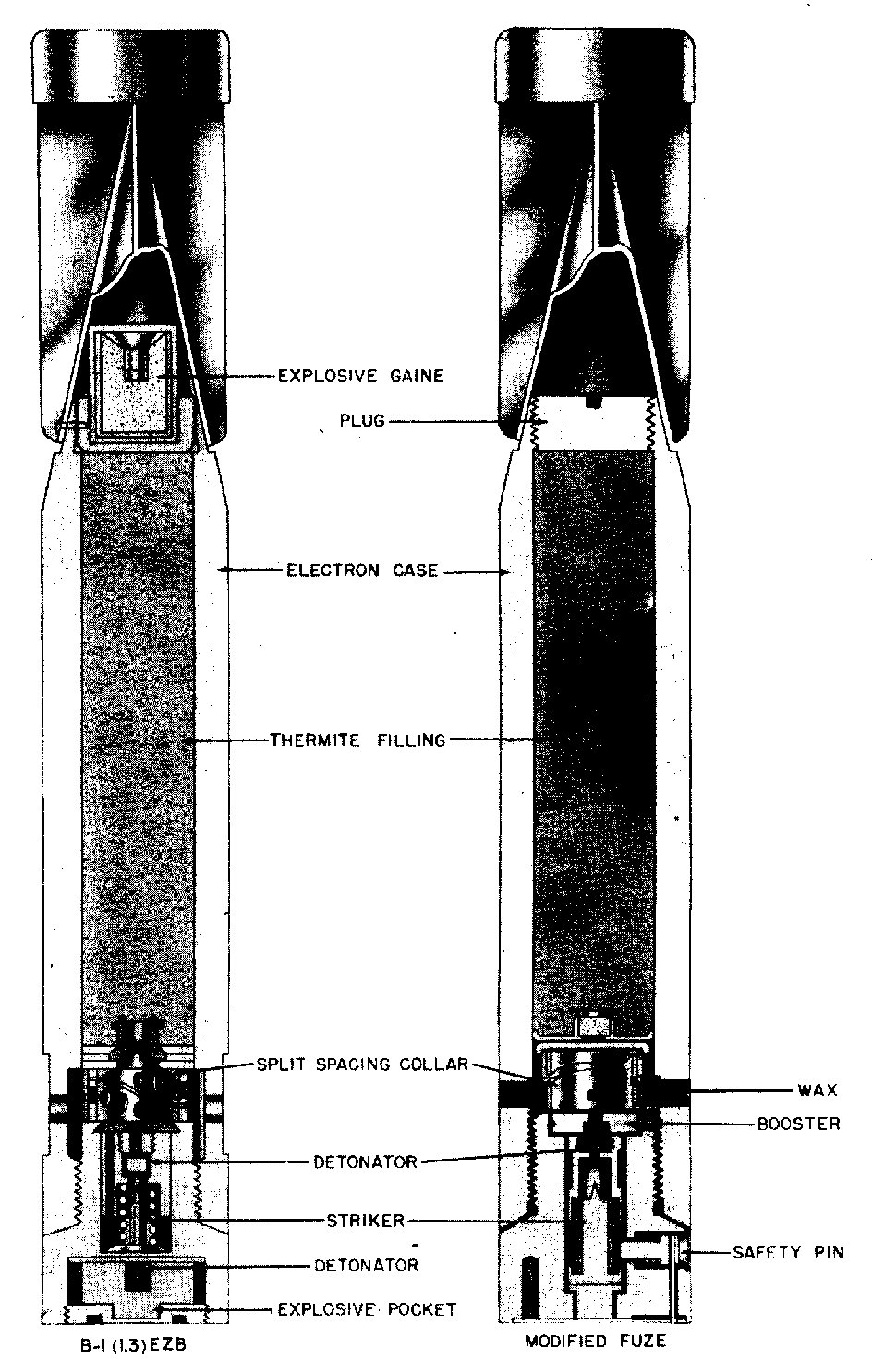
The B1 bomb, which uses Elektron materials

Elektron is the registered trademark of a wide range of magnesium alloys manufactured by a British company, Magnesium Elektron Limited.

There are about 100 alloys in the Elektron range, all containing at least 90.5% magnesium with the remaining 0% to 9.5% composed of a mixture of the following elements in varying proportions: aluminium, yttrium, neodymium, silver, gadolinium, zinc, zirconium, manganese and other rare-earth metals.

The varying amounts of these alloying elements, when added to the magnesium, result in changes to its mechanical properties, such as increased tensile strength, creep resistance, thermal stability, and corrosion resistance. Elektron is unusually light and has a specific gravity of about 1.8 compared with the 2.8 of aluminium alloys, or the 7.9 of steel. Elektron's relatively low density makes its variants suitable for use in auto racing and aerospace engineering applications.

== History ==
Elektron or Elektronmetall was first developed in 1908 by Gustav Pistor and Wilhelm Moschel at the Bitterfeld works of Chemische Fabrik Griesheim-Elektron (CFGE or CFG), the headquarters of which was in Griesheim am Main, Germany. The composition of the initial Elektron alloy was approximately Mg 90%, Al 9%, other 1%. At its pavilion at the International Aviation Fair (Internationale Luftschiffahrt-Ausstellung, ILA) in Frankfurt am Main in 1909, CFG exhibited an Adler 75HP engine with a cast magnesium alloy crankcase. Also exhibiting at the 1909 Frankfurt Air Exhibition was August Euler (1868–1957) – owner of German pilot's licence No. 1 – who manufactured Voisin biplanes under licence in Griesheim am Main. His Voisins with Adler 50 hp engines flew in October 1909.

CFG joined the newly created IG Farben as an associate company in 1916. During the Allied Occupation after World War I, a Major Charles J. P. Ball, DSO, MC, of the Royal Horse Artillery was stationed in Germany. He later joined F. A. Hughes and Co. Ltd., which began manufacturing elektron in the UK under licence from IG Farben from around 1923.

CFG merged fully with the IG Farben conglomerate in 1925 along with Versuchsbau Hellmuth Hirth (a copper alloy manufacturer), to form another company, Elektronmetall Bad Cannstatt Stuttgart. In 1935, IG Farben, ICI and F. A. Hughes and Co. (22% shares) founded Magnesium Elektron Ltd. of Clifton, Greater Manchester. The company is still manufacturing alloys in 2017.

== Uses ==
Elektron has been used in Zeppelin airships, aircraft, and motor racing applications.

Incendiary bombs using elektron were developed towards the end of the First World War by Germany (the B-1E Elektronbrandbombe or Stabbrandbombe) and the UK. Although neither side used this type of bomb operationally during the conflict, Erich Ludendorff mentions in his memoirs a plan to bomb Paris with a new type of incendiary bomb with the aim of overwhelming the city's fire services; this planned raid was also reported in Le Figaro on 21 December 1918. The lightness of elektron meant that a large aeroplane like one of the Riesenflugzeug heavy bombers could carry hundreds of bomblets.

In 1924, magnesium alloys were used in automobile pistons diecast by Elektronmetall GmbH in Bad Cannstatt, another IG Farben company formed out of Versuchsbau Hellmuth Hirth.

An advertisement in the German trade paper Flugsport in 1939 claimed that the record-breaking Arado Ar 79 aircraft contained 25% by weight of elektron, mostly in the Hirth HM 504 A2 4-cylinder inline engine whose crankcase was made of Elektron.

The main engine bearers of the Messerschmitt Bf 109 and the Junkers Ju 87 were made from forged elektron. The air-cooled BMW 801 radial aero engine that powered the Focke-Wulf Fw 190 had a fan made of magnesium alloy, very probably elektron.

British and German incendiary bombs used extensively during World War II weighed about 1 kg and consisted of an outer casing made of elektron alloy, which was filled with thermite pellets and fitted with a fuse. The fuse ignited the thermite, which in turn ignited the magnesium casing; it burned for about 15 minutes. Trying to douse the fire with water intensified the reaction. It could not be extinguished and burned at such a high temperature that it could penetrate armour plate.

Siemens-Halske used elektron casings for their Hellschreiber military teleprinter used during WW2. The die-cast casings of a number of radio sets used by the German Army and by the Luftwaffe made by Lorenz and others were made of elektron. The inter-connecting modular design of these sets meant that the chassis and modules could be mass-produced from intricate moulds within tolerances of 0.1–0.15 mm.

The connectors for the fuel pipes in the engine compartment of Tiger II tanks were originally made of elektron, but they distorted when clamped and were replaced with steel ones.

Japanese San Shiki naval incendiary anti-aircraft shells, also known as beehive shells, were intended to produce a large volume of flame which attacking aircraft would have to fly through. They had a filling of 45% elektron and 40% barium nitrate, a powerful oxidiser.

The prototype 4-seater 1948 Planet Satellite aircraft had a monocoque fuselage of elektron, a solid elektron keel and wings skinned in elektron, but the keel suffered from stress failures and never reached production.

The bodywork of certain racing cars utilized elektron, including the Mercedes-Benz 300 SLR that infamously crashed in the 1955 Le Mans race, highlighting its flammability.

== See also ==
- List of alloys
- Magnesium Elektron
