= F40 =

F40, F.40, or F-40 may refer to:

== Transportation ==
=== Aircraft ===
- Farman F.40, a French pusher biplane reconnaissance aircraft
- Hirth F-40, a German aircraft engine
- F40, the NATO code for the JP-4 jet fuel

=== Automobiles ===
- Beijing F40, a Chinese subcompact pickup truck
- Ferrari F40, an Italian mid-engine sports car
- BMW 1 Series (F40), a German subcompact hatchback
- GM F40 transmission, a car gearbox

=== Trains ===
- EMD F40C, an American diesel-electric locomotive
- EMD F40PH, an American diesel locomotive

=== Watercraft ===
- Brazilian frigate Niterói (F-40), a Niteroi-class frigate of the Brazilian Navy
- HMS Jervis Bay (F40), a British armed merchant cruiser
- HMS Roberts (F40), a Roberts-class monitor of the Royal Navy
- HMS Sirius (F40), a Leander-class frigate of the Royal Navy
- INS Talwar (F40), the lead ship of the Talwar-class frigates of the Indian Navy

== Other uses ==
- F40 (classification), a disability sport classification for athletes of short stature
- F40 (full name F40T12) is a common size fluorescent lamp, at 4 foot or 1.2m
