= Swiss UAV =

Swiss UAV manufacturer

- Company type: Private
- Founded: 2006
- Headquarters: Switzerland
- Products: Unmanned aerial vehicles
- Parent: UMS Aero Group

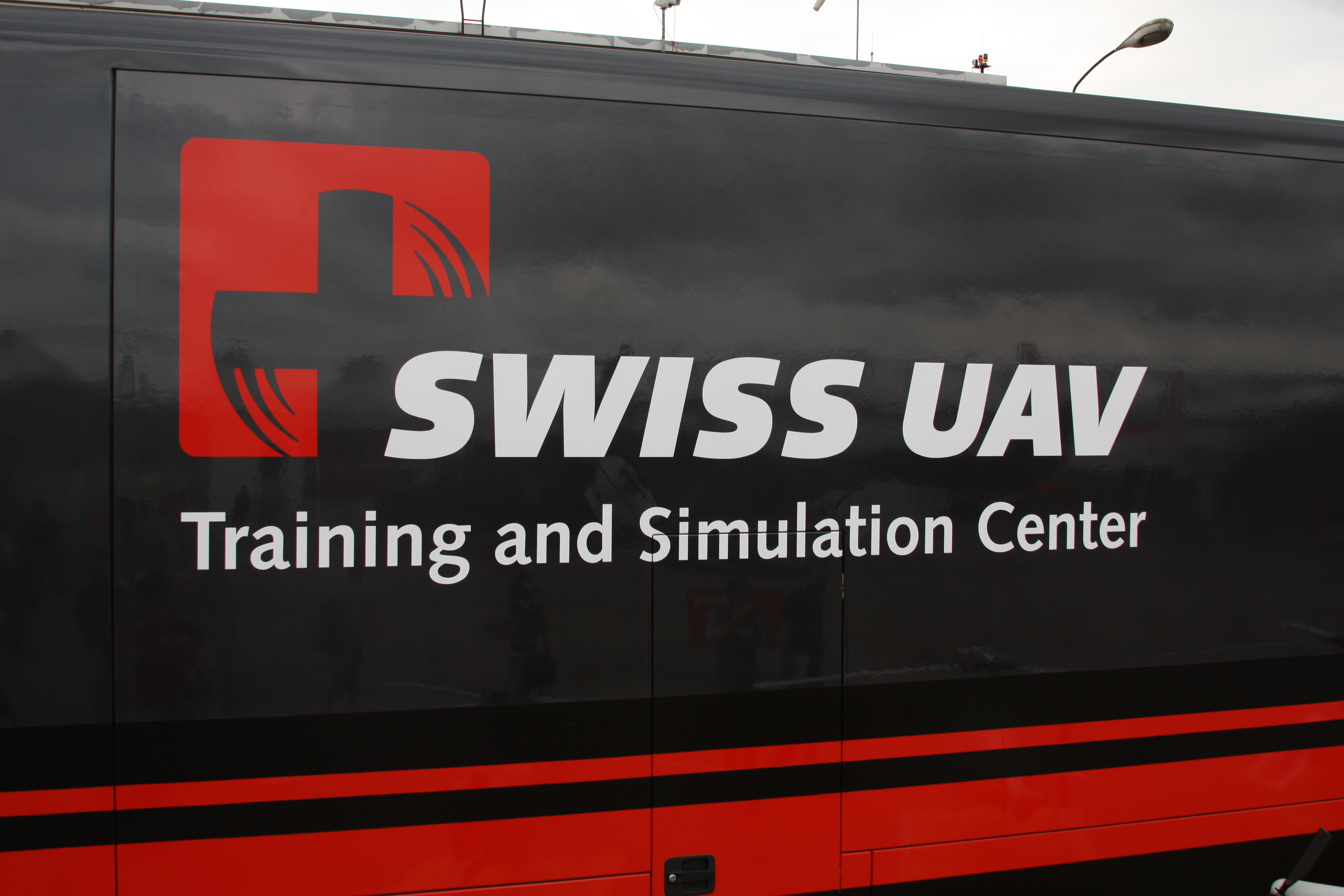
Swiss USV training and simulation center

Swiss UAV AG was a privately owned company based in Switzerland that designed and manufactured unmanned aerial vehicles (drones). The firm developed, produced & sold vertical take-off & landing vehicles from 2006 to 2014. It entered a partnership with Saab in May 2009. In 2013 the firm was acquired by Unmanned Systems AG and the following year merged into UMS Aero Group alongside Swedish company Unmanned Systems AB. At the end of 2015 UMS Aero Group became the majority partner in UMS Skeldar, a joint venture with Saab, manufacturers of the Skeldar unmanned vehicle.
