= List of the largest automotive suppliers =

The German magazine Automobil Industrie publishes a yearly list of the largest automotive suppliers in the world by revenue. For companies that are not pure automotive suppliers, only the automotive supplier divisions are taken into account.

== List ==
Rank	Company	Revenue in 2021 € millions	Country
1.	Bosch	45400	Germany
2.	Denso	41703	Japan
3.	Continental AG	38198	Germany
4.	ZF Friedrichshafen	34865	Germany
5.	Magna	31999	Canada
6.	Hyundai Mobis	30973	South Korea
7.	Aisin	29833	Japan
8.	Michelin	23795	France
9.	Bridgestone	20415	Japan
10.	CATL	18118	China
11.	Cummins	17399	United States
12.	Weichai Power	17379	China
13.	Valeo	17262	France
14.	Lear	17008	United States
15.	Tenneco	15924	United States
16.	Yanfeng Automotive Interiors	15857	China
17.	Faurecia	15618	France
18.	Goodyear	15432	United States
19.	Aptiv	13790	Ireland
20.	Sumitomo Electric	13314	Japan
21.	BorgWarner	13101	United States
22.	Adient	11753	United States
23.	Hitachi	10962	Japan
24.	Mahle	10939	Germany
25.	Yazaki	10627	Japan
26.	Toyota Boshoku	10611	Japan
27.	Marelli	10600	Japan
28.	Schaeffler Group	10284	Germany
29.	Panasonic	10273	Japan
30.	BHAP	9007	China
31.	Samvardhana Motherson	8755	India
32.	Gestamp	8093	Spain
33.	Dana	7898	United States
34.	TE Connectivity	7865	Switzerland
35.	OPmobility	7732	France
36.	Flex-N-Gate	7593	United States
37.	JTEKT	7444	Japan
38.	Autoliv	7266	Sweden
39.	Clarios	6962	United States
40.	Joyson Electronics	6338	China
41.	Benteler	6228	Austria
42.	Sumitomo Rubber Industries	6098	Japan
43.	Toyoda Gosei	6013	Japan
44.	Hella KG Hueck	5904	Germany
45.	Koito Manufacturing	5823	Japan
46.	AVIC Auto	5667	China
47.	Eberspächer	5509	Germany
48.	Hanon Systems	5460	South Korea
49.	LG Electronics	5343	South Korea
50.	Pirelli	5331	Italy
