= Magnesium Elektron =

Magnesium Elektron Ltd (MEL or the Mag) is a British materials manufacturer which produces magnesium and zirconium metals and compounds. Since 2018 it has traded as Luxfer MEL Technologies, following a series of mergers and acquisitions. It is still based in Manchester.

== History ==
The company was founded in 1934, as the British Magnesium (Elektronmetal) Ltd. In 1935 it became Magnesium Elektron Ltd, formed as a joint venture between ICI (48%), I.G. Farbenindustrie (30%) and F.A. Hughes & Co (22%). It started by producing Elektron (or Elektronmetall) under licence. Elektron was first developed in 1908 by Gustav Pistor and Wilhelm Moschel at the Bitterfeld works of Chemische Fabrik Griesheim-Elektron (CFGE or CFG), whose headquarters was in Griesheim am Main, Germany.

In 1936, the company opened a factory on Lumns Lane at Clifton Junction, to the north west of Manchester, to produce magnesium metal. A second plant near Burnley began operation in 1943. During the Second World War, the company made an important contribution to the nation's war effort producing thousands of tons of magnesium metal alloys for the aircraft industry.

During the late 1940s, the company diversified into the production of zirconium and its compounds, and was acquired by the Distillers Company in 1951. Zirconium carbonate production commenced in 1956, to meet a growing demand from the paint, paper and textile industries.

In the 1950s MEL developed magnesium alloys (known collectively as magnox) with non-oxidising properties for use in the cladding of fuel rods for the UK's magnox nuclear power stations. The production of hafnium metal for use in Britain's nuclear submarines began in 1958.

In 1961, Magnesium Elektron became a wholly owned subsidiary of the British Aluminium Company. In 1996, the company was sold to the Luxfer Group. In 2018 it was recombined with MEL Chemicals to become Luxfer MEL Technologies.
