= Saab A3 =

Unmanned stealth aircraft by Saab AB

Saab A3-001
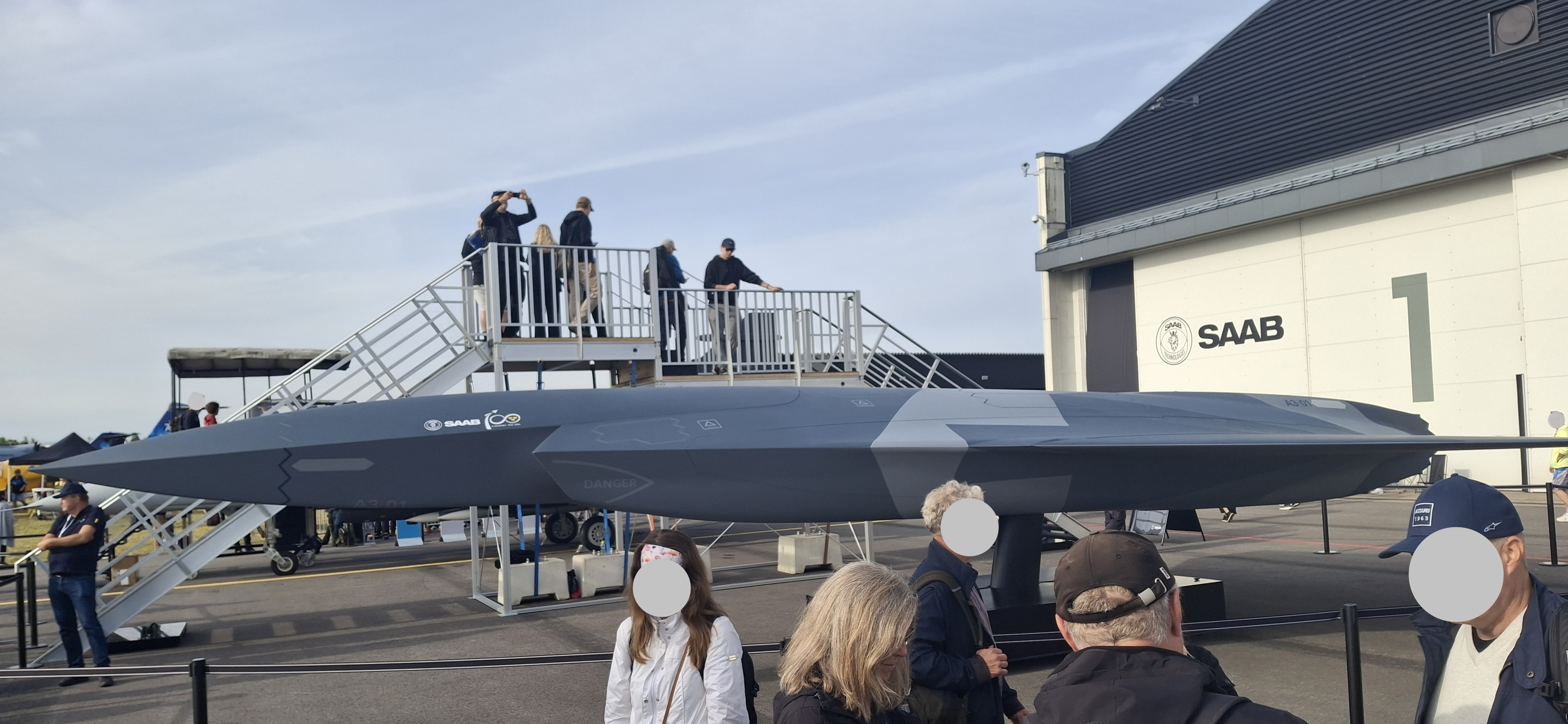
- Saab A3 concept aircraft during the Swedish Airforce 100 year celebrations in the city of Linköping 2026.

General information
- National origin: Sweden
- Manufacturer: Saab AB
- Status: In development

History
- Introduction date: 2030s (planned)

The Saab A3 is an unmanned stealth aircraft under development by the Swedish aircraft manufacturer Saab AB. The concept aircraft was first shown during the 100 Years Celebration of the Swedish Air Force in August 2026. The aircraft is planned to be operational by the mid 2030s.

== Development ==
Saab is planning to make flight test with the first test aircraft, named Saab A1, in 2027/2028. Later on, a second version called Saab A2 will join testing.
