= Hirth HM 501 =

1930s German Inline-6 aircraft engine

HM 501
- Type: Inline piston engine
- National origin: Germany
- Manufacturer: Hirth Motoren GmbH
- Major applications: Arado Ar 231
- Developed from: Hirth HM 500

The Hirth HM 501 was a 6-cylinder liquid-cooled inverted in-line engine that was developed by Hirth Motoren GmbH in the late 1930s, from the 4-cylinder HM 500 and used principally on the submarine-born Arado Ar 231.

== Applications ==
- Arado Ar 231

== Specifications (HM 501A) ==
Data from Flugzeug-Typenbuch. Handbuch der deutschen Luftfahrt- und Zubehör-Industrie 1944

=== General characteristics ===
- Type: 6-cylinder air-cooled inverted in-line aircraft piston engine
- Bore: 105 mm (4.13 in)
- Stroke: 115 mm (4.53 in)
- Displacement: 5.97 L (364.3 cu in)
- Length: 1,272 millimetres (50.1 in)
- Width: 485 mm (19.1 in)
- Height: 662 mm (26.1 in)
- Dry weight: 148 kg (326 lb) dry, unequipped

155 kg (342 lb) wet, equipped

=== Components ===
- Valvetrain: one intake and one exhaust under-head valve per cylinder actuated pushrods and rockers
- Fuel system: SUM 698/2 carburetor
- Fuel type: 80 octane gasoline
- Oil system: Dry sump with one pressure and two scavenge pumps
- Cooling system: Liquid-cooled, ethylene glycol

=== Performance ===
- Power output:

- 160 PS (158 hp; 118 kW) at 2,550 rpm for takeoff
- 145 PS (143 hp; 107 kW) at 2,470 rpm (high performance) at sea level
- 130 PS (128 hp; 96 kW) at 2,380 rpm (max. continuous ) at sea level

- Specific power: 26.8 PS/L (0.43 hp/cu in; 19.71 kW/L)
- Compression ratio: 6.2:1
- Specific fuel consumption: 0.220 kg/PSh (0.492 lb/(hp⋅h); 0.299 kg/kWh) at max continuous
- Oil consumption: 0.002–0.003 kg/PSh (0.004–0.007 lb/(hp⋅h); 0.003–0.004 kg/kWh) at max continuous
- Power-to-weight ratio: 1.075 PS/kg (0.481 hp/lb; 0.791 kW/kg)
- B.M.E.P.: 9.46 atm (9.59 bar; 139.0 psi)
