= Hirth 3002 =

German two-stroke aircraft engine

- Type: Aircraft engine
- National origin: Germany
- Manufacturer: Hirth

The Hirth 3002 is a German aircraft engine, that was designed and produced by Hirth of Benningen for use in ultralight aircraft.

By March 2018, the engine was no longer advertised on the company website and seems to be out of production.

== Design and development ==
The Hirth 3002 is a four-cylinder, two-stroke, horizontally-opposed, 1,042 cc (63.6 cu in) displacement, fan-forced air-cooled, petrol engine design, with a mechanical gearbox reduction drive with reduction ratios from 2.03 to 3.79:1. It employs dual capacitor discharge ignition and produces 83 hp (62 kW) at 6000 rpm.

== Specifications (Hirth 3002 E) ==
Data from Tacke

=== General characteristics ===
- Type: Four cylinder, two stroke aircraft engine
- Bore: 72 mm (2.8 in)
- Stroke: 64 mm (2.5 in)
- Displacement: 1,042 cc (63.6 cu in)
- Length: 380 mm (15.0 in)
- Width: 570 mm (22.4 in)
- Height: 338 mm (13.3 in)
- Dry weight: 42 kg (92.6 lb)

=== Components ===
- Fuel type: petrol
- Cooling system: fan-forced air
- Reduction gear: mechanical gearbox

=== Performance ===
- Power output: 83 hp (62 kW)

== See also ==
Related lists

- List of aircraft engines
