= Mahle GmbH =

German automotive parts manufacturer

MAHLE GmbH
- Type: GmbH
- Industry: Automotive
- Founded: 1 December 1920; 105 years ago
- Founder: Hermann Mahle
- Headquarters: Stuttgart, Germany
- Area served: Worldwide
- Key people: Arnd Franz (Chairman and CEO)
- Products: Automotive parts
- Revenue: €12.4 billion (2022)
- Number of employees: 71,947 (2022)
- Website: www.mahle.com

MAHLE GmbH is a German automotive parts manufacturer based in Stuttgart, Germany. It is one of the largest automotive suppliers worldwide. As a manufacturer of components and systems for the combustion engine and its periphery, the company is one of the three largest systems suppliers worldwide for engine systems, filtration, electrics, mechatronics, and thermal management. In 2018, Mahle's sales amounted to over €12.5 billion.

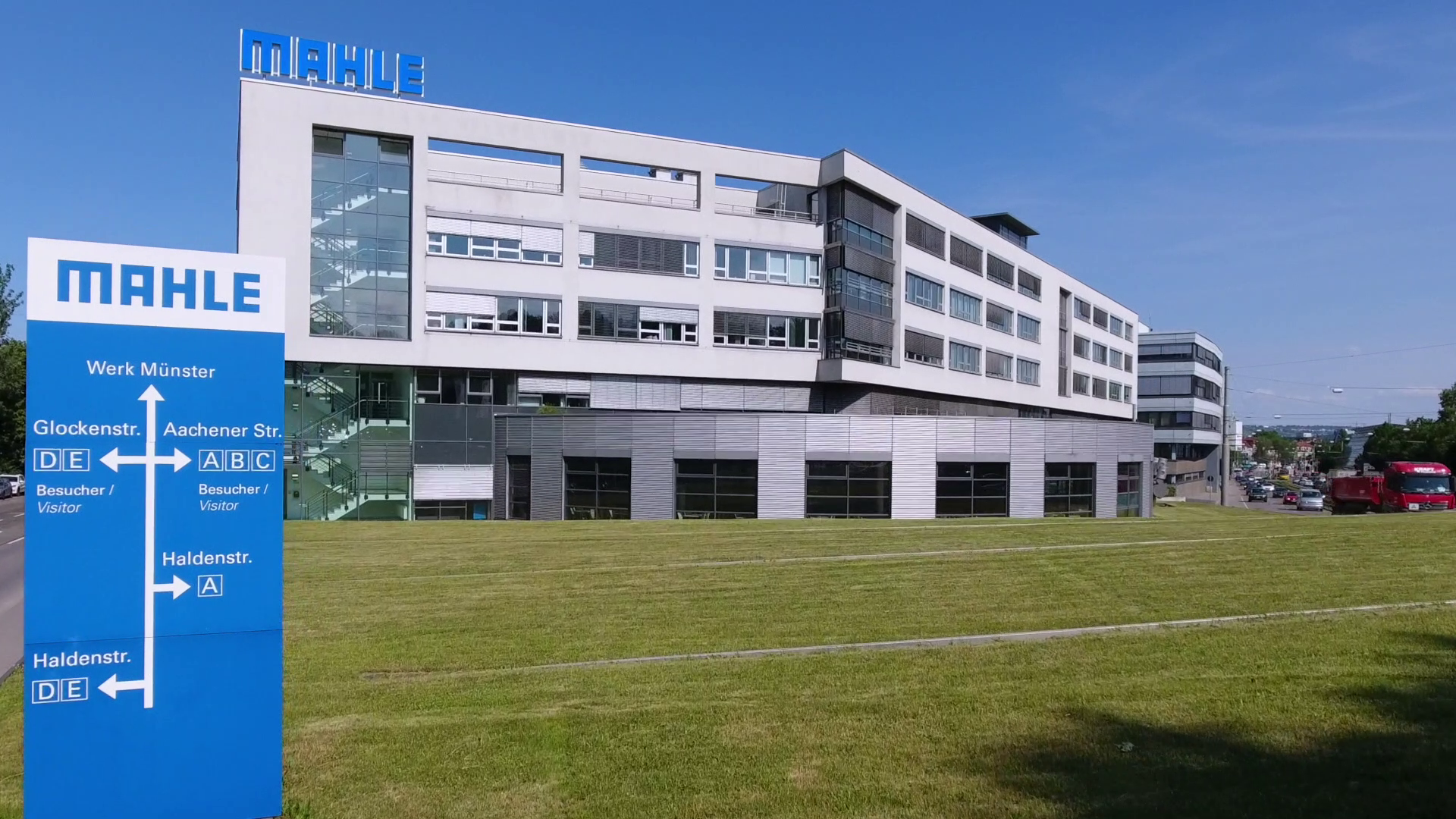
Mahle headquarters in Bad Cannstatt

As of 2022, its approximately 72,000 employees work in 152 production plants and 12 major research and development centers in Germany, Great Britain, the United States, Brazil, Japan, China, India, Poland, Romania, Spain, and Slovenia. Worldwide, over 6000 development engineers and technicians work as partners for Mahle's customers on new products and systems.

== History ==
=== Formation ===
In 1920, engineer and pilot Hellmuth Hirth established a small workshop in Bad Cannstatt with others, where he developed and constructed a two-stroke engine. 26-year-old Hermann Mahle started working for Hirth on 1 December 1920 as his seventh employee. The workshop was then called Versuchsbau Hellmuth Hirth. (Note: Versuchsbau roughly translates to "experimental building".) 1 December 1920 is acknowledged as the birth date of today's Mahle Group.

It soon became clear that the workshop would not survive by only conducting engine tests, so the need arose to build a profitable line of production in order to finance ongoing engine tests. At that time, pistons in automotive engines were generally made of cast iron, but Versuchsbau Hellmuth Hirth experimented with light alloy pistons.

On 1 November 1922, Hermann's brother Ernst joined the factory as head of engineering. In 1924, the company merged with Chemische Fabrik Griesheim-Elektron, the inventors of the magnesium alloy Elektron, and was renamed Elektronmetall GmbH.

In 1927, the company developed Germany's first controlled-expansion piston, and in 1931, the world's first aluminium ring carrier piston for diesel engines. Following this, piston technology was steadily improved. In 1931, aero engine manufacturing was split off as a separate company, Hirth Motoren GmbH.

In 1938, Elektronmetall became Mahle KG, and a new company logo was introduced. The company expanded, and before World War II was the only company in Germany manufacturing die-cast magnesium alloy products. During the war, the company's Bad Cannstatt factory made alloy pistons ranging from those for small cars to pistons with a 40 cm (15.7 in) bore for submarine engines (such as the 522 L (31,854 cu in) diesel MAN M9V 40/46). The Fellbach plant accounted for 70% of Germany's output of magnesium, aluminium and zinc alloy pressure die castings. After 1945, new products were developed and produced (such as aluminium cylinders with Cromal surface coatings in 1951).

In 1964, Hermann and Ernst Mahle decided to waive private ownership in their company and make it part of a foundation for public benefit. They transferred the company shares to the Mahle Foundation.

In 1976, Mahle made the first series-production aluminium engine blocks in Europe using low-pressure die casting. In 1988, their composite camshaft was enhanced to production standards, and in 2001, they developed a cooling system for diesel engine pistons in high-speed passenger cars. The first all-plastic oil filter in the world followed in 2003. Mahle developed and constructed its first complete engine in the same year, which was used in Formula Student.

Mahle has become a predominant system supplier for components of piston systems, cylinder components, valvetrain systems, air management systems, and liquid management systems. The Mahle Group generated sales in excess of €5.2 billion in 2010, and in excess of €12.8 billion in 2017.

== Organization ==
As of 2022, Mahle GmbH consists of five business units and four profit centers.

The five business units are:

- Engine Systems and Components: Produces pistons, cylinders, and related parts.
- Filtration and Engine Peripherals: Produces filters, oil coolers and pumps.
- Thermal Management: Produces cooling systems for batteries and powertrain components of electric cars.
- Electronics and Mechatronics: Produces electric drives, actuators and auxiliaries, and control and power electronics products.
- Aftermarket: As its name suggests, produces spare parts and accessories for the automotive aftermarket.

=== Executives ===
The Mahle Management Board consists of the following members:

- Arnd Franz (since 2022)
- Jumana Al-Sibai (since 2021)
- Georg Dietz (since 2018)
- Markus Kapaun (since 2022)

== Operations ==
At the end of 2025, MAHLE employed 64,242 people and operated 127 production locations and 11 technology centres in 28 countries. Its manufacturing network included 51 locations in Europe and Africa, 21 in North America, 19 in China, 17 elsewhere in East Asia, 11 in India and eight in South America.

In Poland, MAHLE manufactures engine components in Krotoszyn and thermal-management products in Ostrów Wielkopolski. Its Wrocław office provides finance and IT services to the group. In the Czech Republic, the Mnichovo Hradiště plant makes evaporators and radiators, while factory in Mošnov produces condensers, charge-air coolers, heater cores and cooling modules.

MAHLE has expanded its Ramos Arizpe plant in Mexico to supply the North American market and its production and development complex in Changshu, China, for electric-vehicle technologies. In India, it began producing electric compressors in Coimbatore in 2026.

The company's technology centres are located in Stuttgart, Northampton, Valencia and Šempeter pri Gorici in Europe; Detroit and Lockport in the United States; Jundiaí in Brazil; Pune in India; Shanghai and Changshu in China; and Tokyo in Japan. Development activities include electric drives in Slovenia and vehicle electronics in Spain. The Jundiaí centre also houses MAHLE's Global Biomobility Center, which develops technologies for engines running on biofuels.

== Operations ==
At the end of 2025, MAHLE employed 64,242 people and operated 127 production locations and 11 technology centres in 28 countries.

In Europe, MAHLE has a technology centre in Stuttgart, Germany. Its Polish operations include engine-component production in Krotoszyn, thermal-management manufacturing in Ostrów Wielkopolski and finance and IT services in Wrocław. In the Czech Republic, the Mnichovo Hradiště plant makes evaporators and radiators, while factory in Mošnov produces condensers, charge-air coolers, heater cores and cooling modules. Other European technology centres are in Northampton, United Kingdom; Valencia, Spain; and Šempeter pri Gorici, Slovenia.

In the Americas, MAHLE operates technology centres in Detroit and Lockport in the United States and Jundiaí in Brazil. It has expanded its Ramos Arizpe plant in Mexico to supply the North American market. The Jundiaí centre also houses the group's Global Biomobility Center, which develops technologies for engines running on biofuels.

In China, MAHLE has technology centres in Shanghai and Changshu, where it has also expanded its production and development complex for electric-vehicle technologies. Its Indian operations include a technology centre in Pune and electric-compressor production in Coimbatore, which began in 2026.

== See also ==
- MAHLE Powertrain
