= Arado Ar 231 =

German submarine-borne floatplane

Ar 231
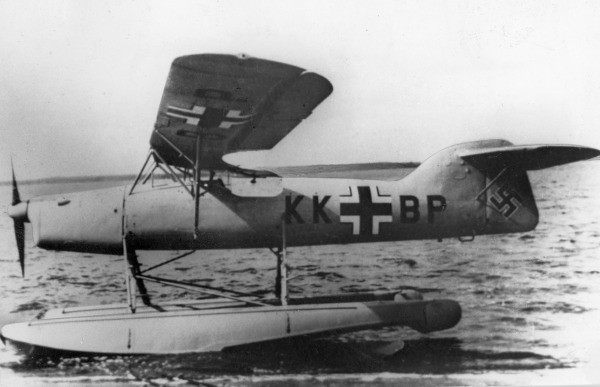

General information
- Type: Submarine-borne reconnaissance floatplane
- National origin: Nazi Germany
- Manufacturer: Arado Flugzeugwerke
- Number built: 6

History
- First flight: 1941

The Arado Ar 231 was a lightweight floatplane, developed during World War II in Nazi Germany as a scout plane for submarines by Arado. The need to be stored inside the submarine necessitated compromises in design that made this single-seat seaplane of little practical use.

== Design and development ==
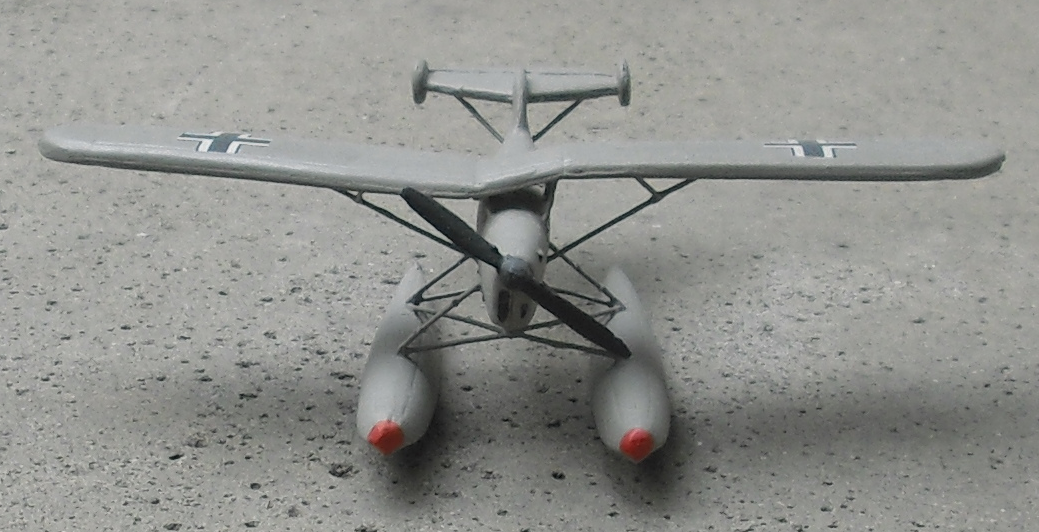
Arado Ar 231 model, front view, showing the special wing configuration

Designed from the outset for use on U-boat "cruisers", like the Type XI B, the Ar 231 was a light parasol-wing aircraft. The aircraft was powered by a 119 kW (160 hp) Hirth HM 501 inline engine, weighed around 1,000 kg (2,200 lb), and had a 10 m (33 ft) wingspan. The design led to a simple and compact aircraft that could be fitted into a storage cylinder only 2 m (6 ft 7 in) in diameter. For ease of storage, the Ar 231's wings featured detachable sections that two operators could remove in less than six minutes. One unusual feature was an offset wing design, with the right wing root attaching to the wing's tilted center section (elevated above the fuselage, as on all parasol-wing designs) and lower than the left wing root, to allow the wings to overlap when folded, so as to occupy less space.

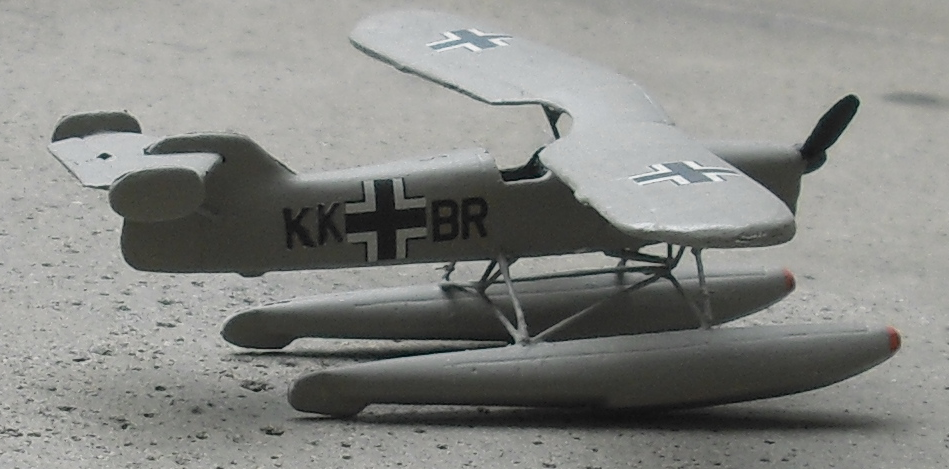
Arado Ar 231 Model side view

== Operational history ==
Testing soon revealed the Ar 231s to be fragile, underpowered, and difficult to fly even during calm weather. Moreover, U-boat commanders were reluctant to linger on the surface for launch and retrieval and, as a result, development ended in favour of the Focke Achgelis Fa 330 gyroglider. Some of the testing was done on the auxiliary cruiser Stier, two of the six prototypes being taken on one voyage.

== Specifications (Ar 231 V1) ==
Data from German aircraft of the Second World War

General characteristics

- Crew: 1
- Length: 7.81 m (25 ft 7 in)
- Wingspan: 10.18 m (33 ft 5 in)
- Height: 3.12 m (10 ft 3 in)
- Wing area: 15.2 m^{2} (164 sq ft)
- Empty weight: 833 kg (1,836 lb)
- Gross weight: 1,050 kg (2,315 lb)
- Powerplant: 1 × Hirth HM 501 6-cylinder air-cooled inverted in-line piston engine, 120 kW (160 hp)
- Propellers: 2-bladed fixed-pitch propeller

Performance

- Maximum speed: 170 km/h (110 mph, 92 kn)
- Cruise speed: 130 km/h (81 mph, 70 kn)
- Range: 500 km (310 mi, 270 nmi)
- Endurance: 4 hours
- Service ceiling: 3,000 m (9,800 ft)
- Wing loading: 69.1 kg/m^{2} (14.2 lb/sq ft)
- Power/mass: 0.113 kW/kg (0.069 hp/lb)

== See also ==
Aircraft of comparable role, configuration, and era

- Aichi M6A
- Besson MB.411
- Parnall Peto
- Watanabe E9W
- Yokosuka E14Y

Related lists

- List of submarine-borne aircraft
- List of World War II military aircraft of Germany
- List of military aircraft of Germany
