= Saalina =

Boat made by SAAB after World War II

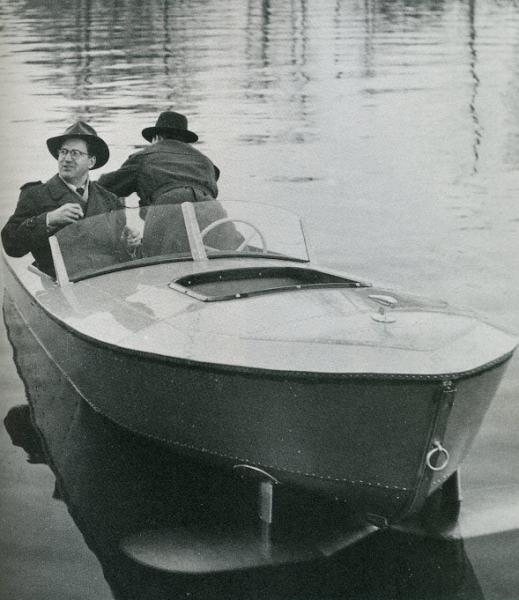
Saab Saalina 1946

Saalina was a four-meter-long (13 ft) boat made by SAAB after World War II.

When the war ended the interest in making fighter planes went down and SAAB needed something to use all the aluminium sheets they had stored. Kurt Sjögren thus designed an aluminium boat and 250 boats were made. However, the cost of the boats became very high since they were made like the aircraft with every rivet polished down. Then there was a problem with that the aluminium rivets did not stand seawater and quickly turned the boats into sieves.

Measurements

- Length: 4.0 metres (157.5 in)
- Width. 1.45 metres (57.1 in)
