= UMS Skeldar =

UAV manufacturer based in Switzerland and Sweden

UMS Skeldar AG
- Company type: Private
- Industry: Aerospace
- Founded: 2015
- Headquarters: Switzerland
- Products: Aircraft and components
- Owner: UMS Aero Group, Saab
- Website: umsskeldar.aero

UMS Skeldar AG is an aircraft manufacturer based in Sweden, with both headquarters and manufacturing facilities in Linköping. It was formed in 2018 as a joint venture between majority shareholder UMS Aero Group and Saab. Its principle product is the Skeldar range of unmanned aircraft systems (UAS) rotorcraft. The company also owns the Hirth company, whose range of light two-stroke engines provide the power units for the rotorcraft.

== Formation ==
Swiss UAV AG was a privately owned company based in Switzerland that designed and manufactured unmanned aerial vehicles (drones).

It entered a partnership with Saab, in May 2009.

In 2013, Swiss UAV was acquired by Unmanned Systems AG and the following year merged into UMS Aero Group alongside Swedish company Unmanned Systems AB.

At the end of 2015 UMS Aero Group and Saab, manufacturers of the Skeldar unmanned vehicle, formed UMS Skeldar, a joint venture in which UMS Aero Group is the majority partner. Besides its Swiss headquarters and manufacturing, it maintains a manufacturing facility in Sweden, as UMS Skeldar Sweden AB.

== Aircraft ==
Earlier types have included:

- F-330 Fixed-wing UAS.
- F-720 Fixed-wing UAS.
- R-350 Rotary UAS.

Current products include two rotorcraft drone systems:

- UMS Skeldar V-200
- UMS Skeldar V-150

== Subsidiary companies ==
UMS Skeldar acquired the long-established Hirth German light piston engine manufacturer in 2018. Hirth provide the heavy-fuel (jet fuel) engines used in the rotorcraft.
