= Hellmuth Hirth =

German aerospace engineer (1886–1938)

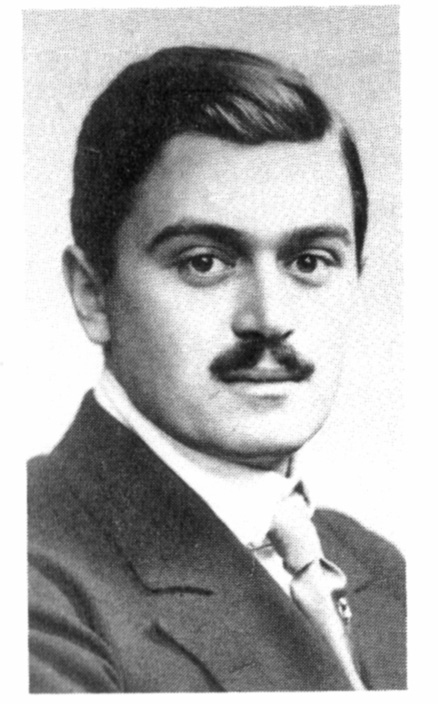
- Born: 24 April 1886; Heilbronn, Württemberg, Germany
- Died: 1 July 1938 (aged 52); Karlsbad, Sudetenland, Germany
- Cause of death: Plane crash
- Known for: Founder of Mahle and Hirth Engines

Hellmuth Hirth (German: [ˈhɛlmuːt ˈhɪʁt]; 24 April 1886 – 1 July 1938) was a German engineer who founded the Mahle GmbH and Hirth companies, manufacturing engine components and complete aircraft engines respectively.

== Biography ==
Hirth was born in Heilbronn, the son of engineer and tool-maker Albert Hirth. He was the elder brother of Wolf Hirth who would go on to become a famous sailplane designer and manufacturer.

As a young man, Hirth was sent to the United States to train with the Edison General Electric Company as a mechanic. While abroad, he developed an interest in aircraft, and on his return to Germany in 1909 became involved with the emerging industry. He built his own aircraft in 1910 and soon went to work for the Zeppelin Company building airships. He also became a prominent pilot.

Since 1914 he was a Leutnant of the Fliegertruppe, winning the Iron Cross II and being severely wounded.

In 1920, he founded his own company to manufacture engine components out of light alloys, and by 1927 split the company in order to focus more closely on the aero engine side of the business.

== Death ==
On 1 July 1938 Hirth was killed in a plane crash in Karlsbad.

== See also ==
- Hirth
- Hirth joint
