= Hirth F-40 =

German two-stroke aircraft engine

- Type: Aircraft engine
- National origin: Germany
- Manufacturer: Hirth

The Hirth F-40 is a German aircraft engine, that was designed and produced by Hirth of Benningen for use in ultralight aircraft.

By March 2018, the engine was no longer advertised on the company website and seems to be out of production.

== Design and development ==
The Hirth F-40 is a four-cylinder, two-stroke, 1,300 cc (79.3 cu in) displacement, liquid-cooled, petrol engine design, with a helical gear mechanical gearbox reduction drive. It produces 120 hp (89 kW) at 4800 rpm.

== Specifications (F-40) ==
Data from Tacke

=== General characteristics ===
- Type: Four-cylinder, two-stroke aircraft engine
- Bore: 76 mm (3.0 in)
- Stroke: 69 mm (2.7 in)
- Displacement: 1,300 cc (79.3 cu in)
- Dry weight: 69 kg (152.1 lb)

=== Components ===
- Fuel type: petrol
- Cooling system: liquid
- Reduction gear: helical gear mechanical gearbox

=== Performance ===
- Power output: 120 hp (89 kW)

== See also ==
Related lists

- List of aircraft engines
