= Saab AB =

Swedish aerospace and defense company

- Formerly: SAAB/Saab AB (1937–68); Saab-Scania (1968–95)
- Type: Publicly traded Aktiebolag
- Traded as: Nasdaq Stockholm: SAAB B OMX Stockholm 30
- Industry: Aerospace and defence
- Founded: 1937 in Trollhättan, Sweden
- Founders: Marcus Wallenberg Jr.; Axel Wenner-Gren; Sven Gustaf Wingqvist
- Headquarters: Stockholm, Sweden
- Area served: Worldwide
- Key people: Marcus Wallenberg (Chairman); Micael Johansson (President & CEO)
- Products: Air traffic control; Air traffic control systems; Fighter aircraft; Military aircraft; Military systems; Radars; Military watercraft
- Revenue: ▲79.146 billion kr (2025)
- Operating income: ▲8.066 billion kr (2025)
- Net income: ▲6.356 billion kr (2025)
- Total assets: ▲124.704 billion kr (2025)
- Total equity: ▲43.676 billion kr (2025)
- Owner: Wallenberg family (38.9%; 47.6% votes)
- Number of employees: ▲26,100 (2025)
- Subsidiaries: BlueBear; Combitech; CrowdAI; UMS Skeldar
- Website: saab.com

Saab AB (originally Svenska Aeroplan Aktiebolaget, lit. 'The Swedish Aeroplane Corporation', acronym SAAB), with subsidiaries collectively known as the Saab Group (Swedish: Saabgruppen), is a Swedish aerospace and defence company primarily operating from Sweden. The company is headquartered in Stockholm, but its development and manufacturing operations are undertaken in Linköping.

The company was formally founded by AB Bofors in 1937, by reforming the aero engine division of company NOHAB (founded in 1930), located in Trollhättan, into a proper aircraft manufacturer. It would soon merge with aircraft manufacturer ASJA (founded in 1931), located in Linköping, in 1940, which had its own design bureau and is considered the spiritual predecessor to today's Saab AB. This formed the SAAB-concern, with the factory in Trollhättan becoming SAAB/T and the factory in Linköping (previously ASJA) becoming SAAB/L and design headquarters.

From 1947, Saab started producing automobiles, the automobile division being spun off as Saab Automobile in 1990, a joint venture with General Motors. The joint venture ended in 2000 when GM took complete ownership. From 1968 onwards the company was in a merger with commercial vehicle manufacturer Scania-Vabis, known as Saab-Scania. The two were de-merged in 1995 by the new owners, Investor AB. (Note: Despite the demerger, both Saab and Scania share the right to use the griffin logo, which originates from the coat of arms of the Swedish region of Scania.)

== History ==
=== Svenska Aeroplan Aktiebolaget (SAAB) ===
SAAB's logotype from 1939, depicting a license built Junkers Ju 86, the first aircraft produced by the company.

Saab was founded by AB Bofors in 1937 as Svenska Aeroplan Aktiebolaget (acronym SAAB; lit. 'The Swedish Aeroplane Corporation'), located in Trollhättan, by reforming the aircraft engine division of engineering company NOHAB (Nohab Flygmotorfabrik AB, lit. 'Nohab Aero engine factory'), which had been acquired by Bofors in 1935. Bofors had in recent years been in development with the Swedish Air Force (SAF) to create aircraft weaponry and ordnance and wanted to create an aircraft manufacturing subortinate which could take a monopoly over the SAF's future aircraft orders, a premise supported by the SAF. At the time, however, there already was a competing company formed with this premise in 1931, by the name of ASJA (AB Svenska Järnvägsverkstädernas Aeroplanavdelning, lit. 'The Swedish Railway workshops Aeroplane department'), located in Linköping, which was a successor to Svenska Aero (SA) under Sven Blomberg, head designer of the Svenska Aero Jaktfalken fighter plane. ASJA had solicit Blomberg from Svenska Aero in 1930 and later purchased the company in 1932 along with their portfolio of designs, quickly making them the leading aeroplane manufacturer in Sweden at the time.

Bofors started negotiating with ASJA in 1936 to see if they could enter into a sort of stock sharing consortium lead under a parent company. Such a deal was struck in 1937, with support from the SAF, the parent company being named AB Förenade Flygverkstäder (AFF). To ease future competition, Bofors bought out small competitor E. Sparmanns aircraft workshop, which at the time was developing a modern fighter for the SAF, under the name of Sparmann E4.

Despite the consortium, SAAB in Trollhättan (previously Nohab Flygmotorfabrik AB) still had to compete with ASJA over contracts and the cooperation never came to fruition. While SAAB in Trollhättan got a few contracts, such as license producing the Junkers Ju 86 bomber for the Swedish Air Force (SAF designation B 3) in 1938, ASJA won most of the contracts from the SAF, such as license production of the Hawker Hart (B 4) and Northrop Model 8 (B 5). After ASJA's design bureau produced the winning designs for what eventually became the Saab 17 (ASJA L-10) and Saab 18 (ASJA L-11), beating out AFF/SAAB's competing F.1 and G.1 designs, it was decided in March 1939 to scrap AFF and formally reform ASJA into the SAAB-concern, the Trollhättan factory (previously Nohab) becoming SAAB/T and the Linköping factory (previous ASJA) becoming SAAB/L, the latter becoming headquarters.

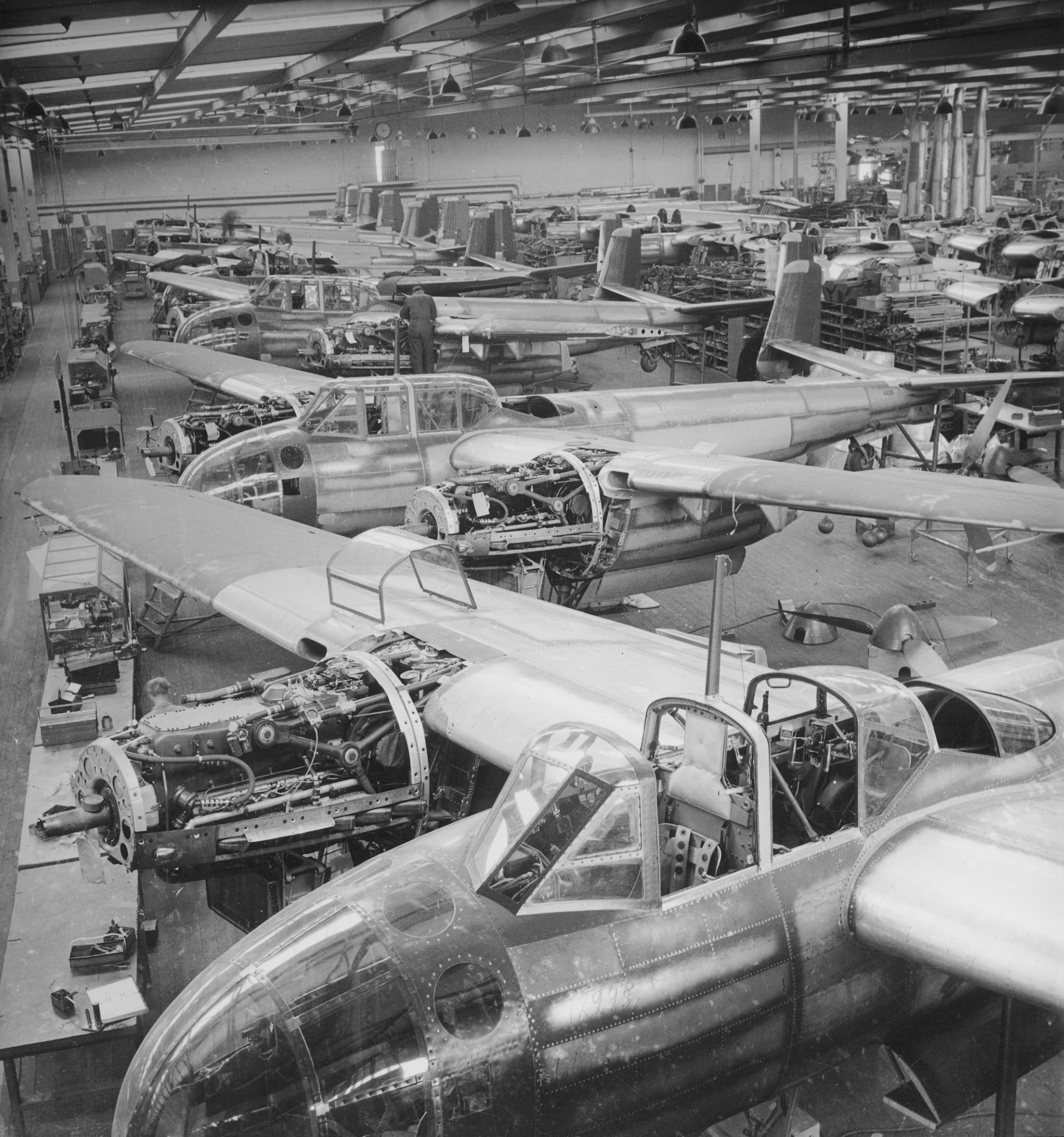
SAAB 18B (internal name L-18B) being produced at the Saab Linköping factory at the end of World War II.

The basic initial development was the problems for the Swedish government to get quality military aircraft delivered at the beginning of the Second World War. The final trigger was the inability to get a large number of Seversky P-35 delivered from the United States. From then on the Swedish government focused on establishing domestic production and development of military aircraft which Saab became involved in, a policy that has continued to this day. The first SAAB-developed aircraft was the SAAB 17 light dive bomber (first flight: 1940-05-18), soon followed by the SAAB 18 schnellbomber (first flight: 1942-06-19) and SAAB 21 single-seat fighter (first flight: 1943-07-30), among other developments, the latter being the first aircraft to see service with a modern style ejection seat, using gunpowder to eject instead of compressed air like the contemporary German counterparts.

SAAB's logotype from around 1943.

Originally manufacturing aircraft, the company sought ways in which to diversify its business. Before the Second World War, a majority of cars in Sweden were imported from the United States. The US car manufacturers were producing tanks during the war, and the US domestic market took all the US car production in the late 1940s. Hence there was a large supply shortage of private cars in Europe and Sweden, and buyers were facing waiting lists for years for new cars. In the late 1940s, Saab began manufacturing cars at its Saab Automobile division, based in Trollhättan. The first car was the Saab 92; full-scale production started 12 December 1949, based on the prototype Ursaab. Around 1950 the style "Saab" started being used instead of the all caps "SAAB".

In the late 1950s Saab ventured into the computer market with Datasaab. The company was a result partly of the need to make a computer that would be small enough to mount in an aeroplane as navigational equipment. During the 1960s several computers were developed and sold to European countries, for uses such as banking. The aircraft computer (CK 37) was used in 1971 in the Viggen. The company was sold in 1975 to Sperry UNIVAC, while Saab retained its flight computer development.

=== Saab AB ===
Saab's logotype from the late 1950s.

In May 1965, the company name was changed to Saab AB to reflect its broad range of activities.

In 1968 Saab AB merged with the Swedish lorry, bus and heavy-duty diesel engine manufacturer Scania-Vabis, and became Saab-Scania AB.

In 1990 General Motors bought 51% of the car division Saab Automobile, and acquired the rest a decade later.

In 1991 Investor AB completed a leveraged buyout of Saab-Scania AB. Investor AB acquired all the outstanding shares in Saab-Scania for approximately SEK 21 billion. Saab-Scania became a wholly owned subsidiary of Investor AB and the company was de-listed.

In 1995 Saab-Scania was divided by Investor AB into two independent companies, de-merging into Scania AB and Saab AB. The intention by Investor AB was to broaden ownership in the two companies later. Following the sale of 50% of the car division Saab Automobile AB to General Motors, the main reason behind the merger with lorry manufacturer Scania-Vabis in 1968 had disappeared.

Also in 1995 Saab Military Aircraft and British Aerospace (now BAE Systems) formed the joint venture company Saab-BAe Gripen AB, to manufacture, market and support Gripen internationally. This co-operation was extended in 2001 with the formation of Gripen International for the same purpose. From 1998 until 2005, British Aerospace/BAE was the largest shareholder in Saab following its acquisition of a 35% stake from Investor AB. In January 2005, BAE Systems reduced its shareholding to 20%. Investor AB maintained a 20% share.

On 16 November 1999, Saab announced its intention is to purchase Celsius AB and the acquisition was concluded by early March 2000.

In September 2000 United Defense Industries (UDI) purchased Bofors Weapon Systems from Saab (the autocannon and tube artillery interests), while Saab retained the missile interests.

In December 2005 Saab joined the Dassault nEUROn project as a major partner.

In October 2008 the company announced its intention to merge its operations with that of Simrad Optronics. The new unit will develop high-tech optronics products and will be headquartered in Norway, although other details of the new arrangement have not been finalized.

In 2010 the company restructured from fifteen business units into five business areas; Aeronautics, Dynamics, Electronic Defence Systems, Security and Defence Solutions, and Support and Services. According to Saab the restructuring was undertaken to become more market and customer oriented.

In March 2010, BAE Systems sold half of its 20% stake in the company to Investor AB, which then became the major shareholder. In June 2011, the British company sold its remaining stake bringing its 16-year involvement in Saab to an end.

As of August 2020, Investor AB owns a 30.16% stake in the company (39.69% of the voting rights) and is the top owner.

In August 2023, it was announced Saab had acquired the Bedford, UK–based manufacturer of AI-enabled autonomous swarm systems, Blue Bear Research Systems.

In September 2023, it was announced Saab had acquired the San Francisco–headquartered artificial intelligence / machine learning development company CrowdAI.

=== Aircraft production ===
The main focus of aircraft production is fighter aircraft. Saab has been making aircraft since the 1930s, and the jet predecessors of the JAS 39 Gripen were the Tunnan, the Lansen, the Draken and the Viggen. The last civilian models made by Saab were the Saab 340 and Saab 2000. Both were mid-range turboprop-powered airliners. The development and the manufacturing of these aircraft is undertaken in Linköping.

In May 2019, Saab announced plans to locate a new U.S. manufacturing operation in Discovery Park District Aerospace on the west side of the Purdue University campus. The facility will do the final assembly of the T-X advanced jet trainer, which is a plane developed by Boeing and Saab for the United States Air Force.

== Organization ==
=== Aeronautics ===
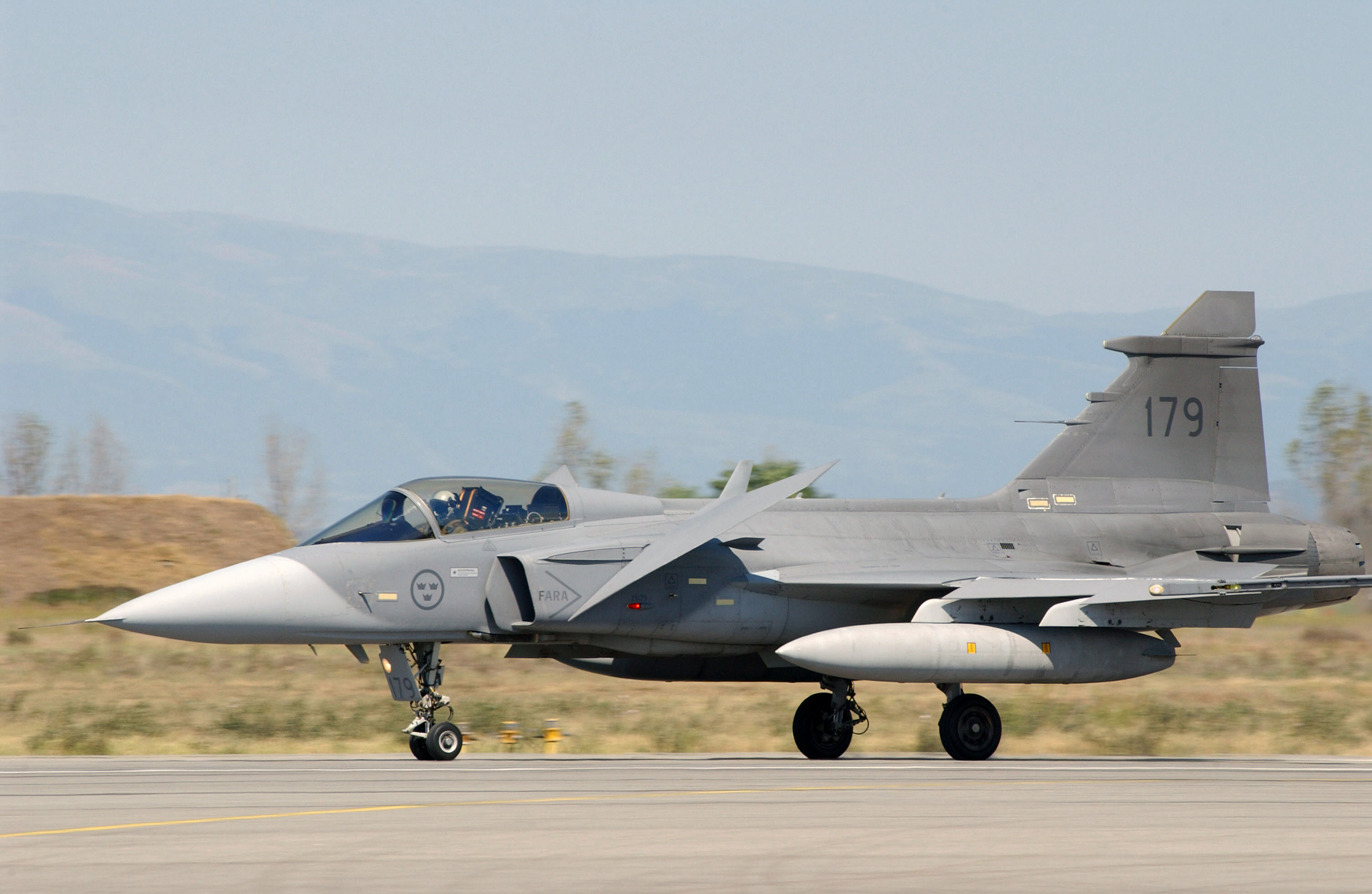
JAS 39 Gripen

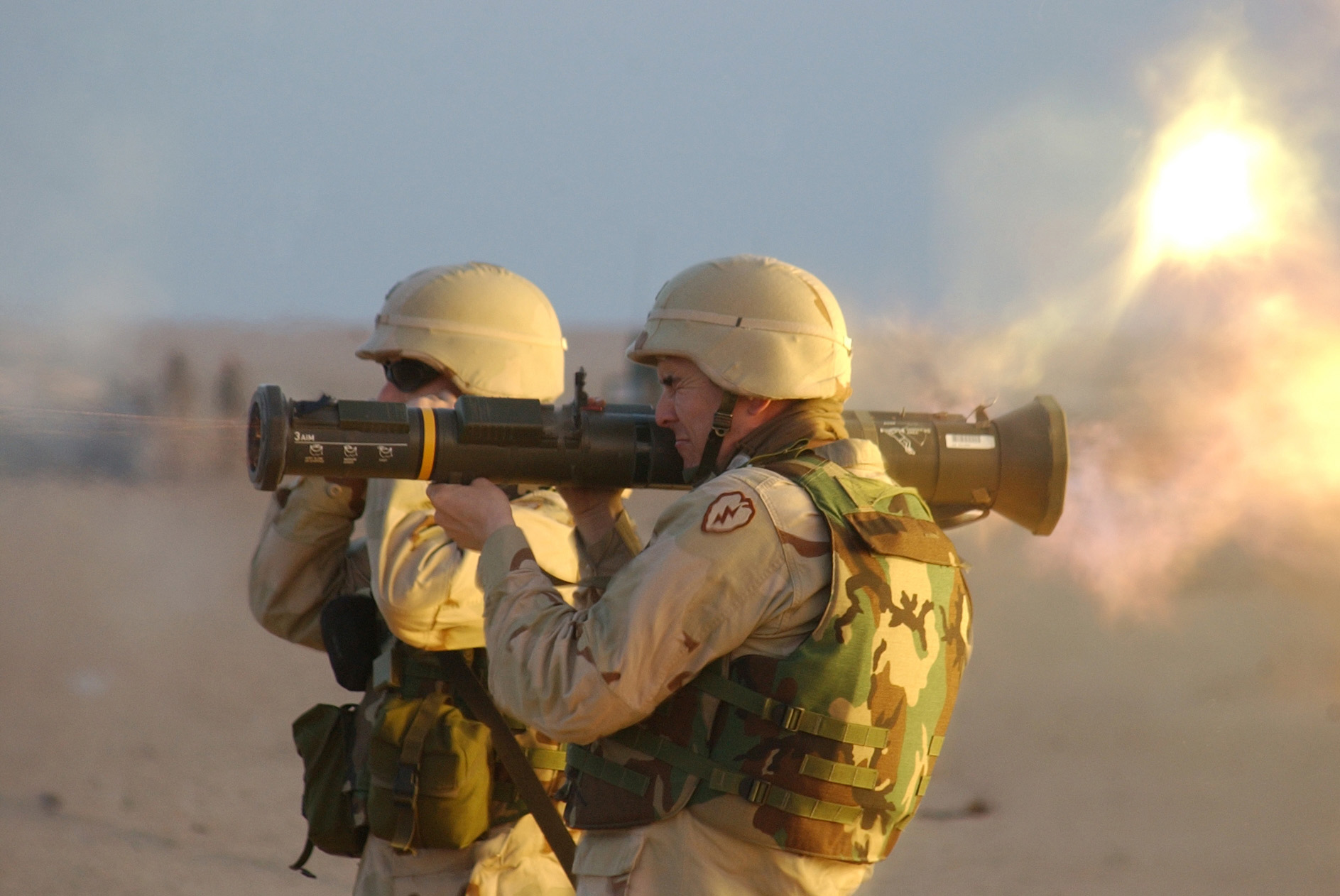
Saab AT4 portable anti-tank weapon

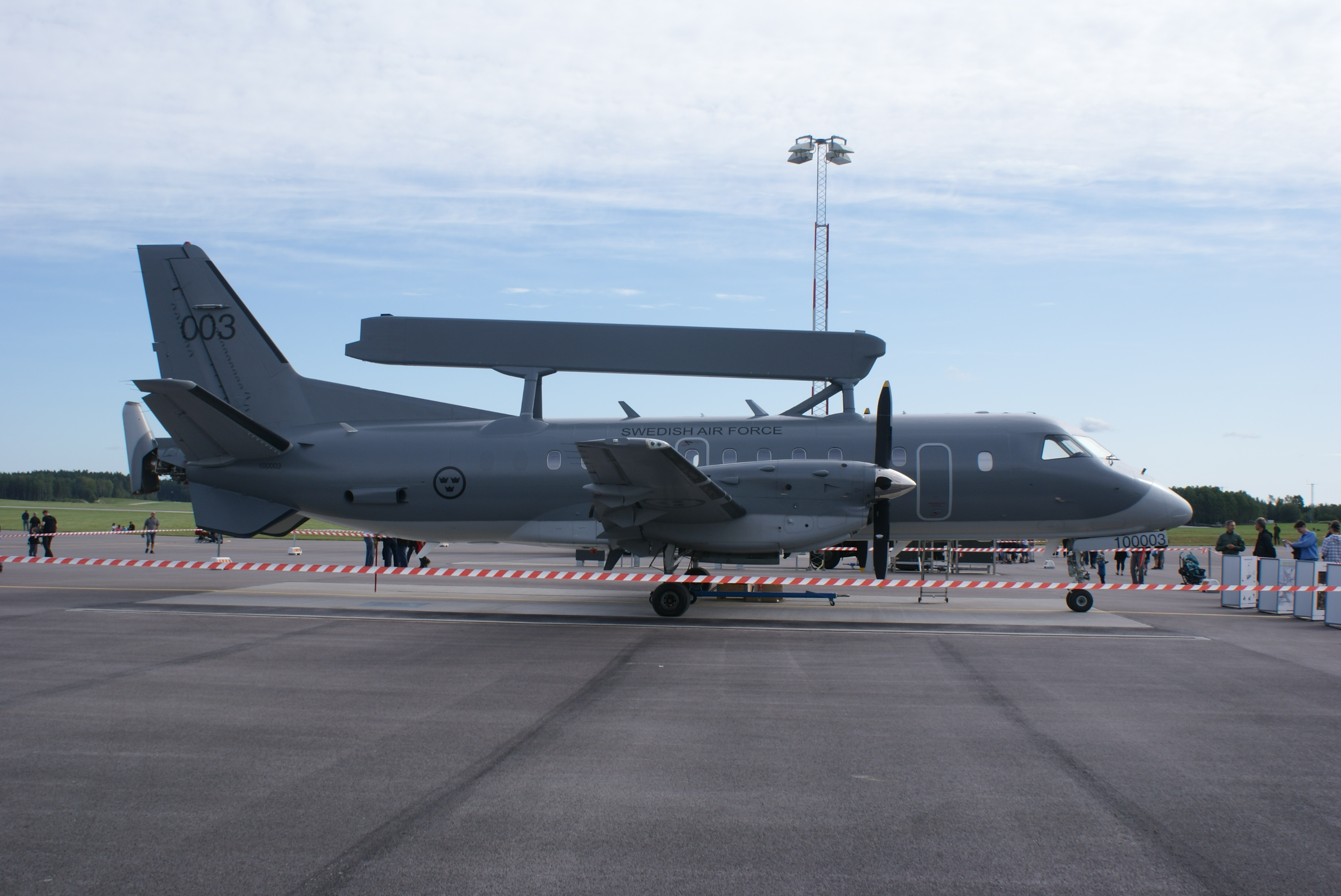
Saab 340 with Erieye radar

Aeronautics offers airborne systems, related subsystems, Unmanned Aerial Systems (UAS) and aerostructures. The business area Aeronautics is responsible for airframe structures for JAS 39 Gripen, and whole sections for Airbus, Boeing and NH90; & system development of the JAS 39 Gripen and the Skeldar VTOL UAV. Aeronautics is also partner in the European joint UAV-project Dassault nEUROn, where Saab develop avionics and is responsible for the overall architecture and design. Marketing and support of the JAS 39 Gripen fighter jet is also included in the Aeronautics business area.

=== Dynamics ===
Dynamics offers ground combat weapons, missile systems, torpedoes, sensor systems, unmanned underwater vehicles such as Sabertooth and signature management systems, remotely operated vehicles for armed forces as well as civil security applications.

Short range weapons offered include the Carl Gustaf, AT4/AT4 CS, STRIX and NLAW. Missile systems offered are the RBS 70, RBS 23 and RBS 15.

=== Surveillance ===
Surveillance offers airborne surveillance (including GlobalEye, Saab 2000 Erieye) AEW&C and fighter radar, ground-based and naval radar (including the Giraffe radar range), electronic warfare (including IDAS and ESTL) and combat systems and C4I.

=== Industrial Products and Services ===
Industrial Products and Services was established on 1 January 2015 and comprises the business units Combitech, Avionics Systems, Aerostructures, Traffic Management, Vricon as well as the development of product ideas that fall outside of Saab's core business.

The business units within Industrial Products and Services differ from Saab's other operations by their focus on business-to-business (B2B) customers or because they are not dependent on Saab's principal end-customers. Other business areas within Saab have a customer base largely consisting of public authorities. With different customer groups come different management strategies and priorities. Opportunities to strengthen these operations in the long term are greater in the new organisation. Industrial Products and Services will work with individual growth strategies for each business unit.

=== Support and Services ===
Support and Services offer maintenance, integrated support, field facilities, logistics and regional aircraft maintenance.

Saab Aircraft Leasing leases and resells Saab aircraft to airlines. It completed 30 transactions in 2010.

=== Saab Barracuda LLC ===
The Saab Barracuda LLC facility in Lillington, North Carolina, manufactures signature management products and provides customized services. Foremost among the camouflage, concealment and deception products is the Ultra Lightweight Camouflage Net System (ULCANS) which provides multi-spectral protection against visual, near infrared, thermal infrared and broadband radar detection. ULCANS is fielded with the U.S. Army and other Department of Defense organizations and is available in both woodland and desert versions. Saab Barracuda is one of only two qualified suppliers of ULCANS in North America, and currently has a competed US$1.76 billion contract, along with GMA Cover Corp.

=== Saab Kockums ===
The Kockums shipyard is the base for the company's submarine division.

== Products ==
=== Military aircraft ===
- Saab 17 (bomber/dive-bomber: manufactured 1941–1944, 323 built)
- Saab 18 (twin-engine bomber and reconnaissance aircraft: manufactured 1944–1948, 245 built)
- Saab 21 (twin-boom push-prop fighter/attack aircraft: manufactured 1945–1949, 298 built)
- Saab 21R (jet-powered version of Saab 21: manufactured 1950–1952, 64 built)
- Saab 29 Tunnan (first purpose-built jet fighter: manufactured 1950–1956, 661 built)
- Saab 32 Lansen (attack aircraft: manufactured 1953–1959, 450 built)
- Saab 35 Draken (fighter: manufactured 1955–1974, 644 built)
- Saab 37 Viggen (fighter/attack/reconnaissance aircraft: manufactured 1970–1990, 329 built)
- Saab JAS 39 Gripen (multirole fighter: introduced 1996, 306 built as of 2020)
- Saab 105 (twin engine trainer: manufactured 1963–1972, 192 built)
- Saab 340 AEW&C (airborne early warning and control aircraft: manufactured 1994–1999, 12 built)
- Boeing-Saab T-7 Red Hawk (advanced pilot training aircraft: developed by Boeing in partnership with Saab Group, 2 demonstrators built, 351 trainers to be purchased by the USAF)

=== Cancelled military aircraft projects ===
- Saab 36 (bomber, 1950s, none built)
- Saab 38 (attack/trainer, 1970s, none built)

=== Civilian aircraft ===
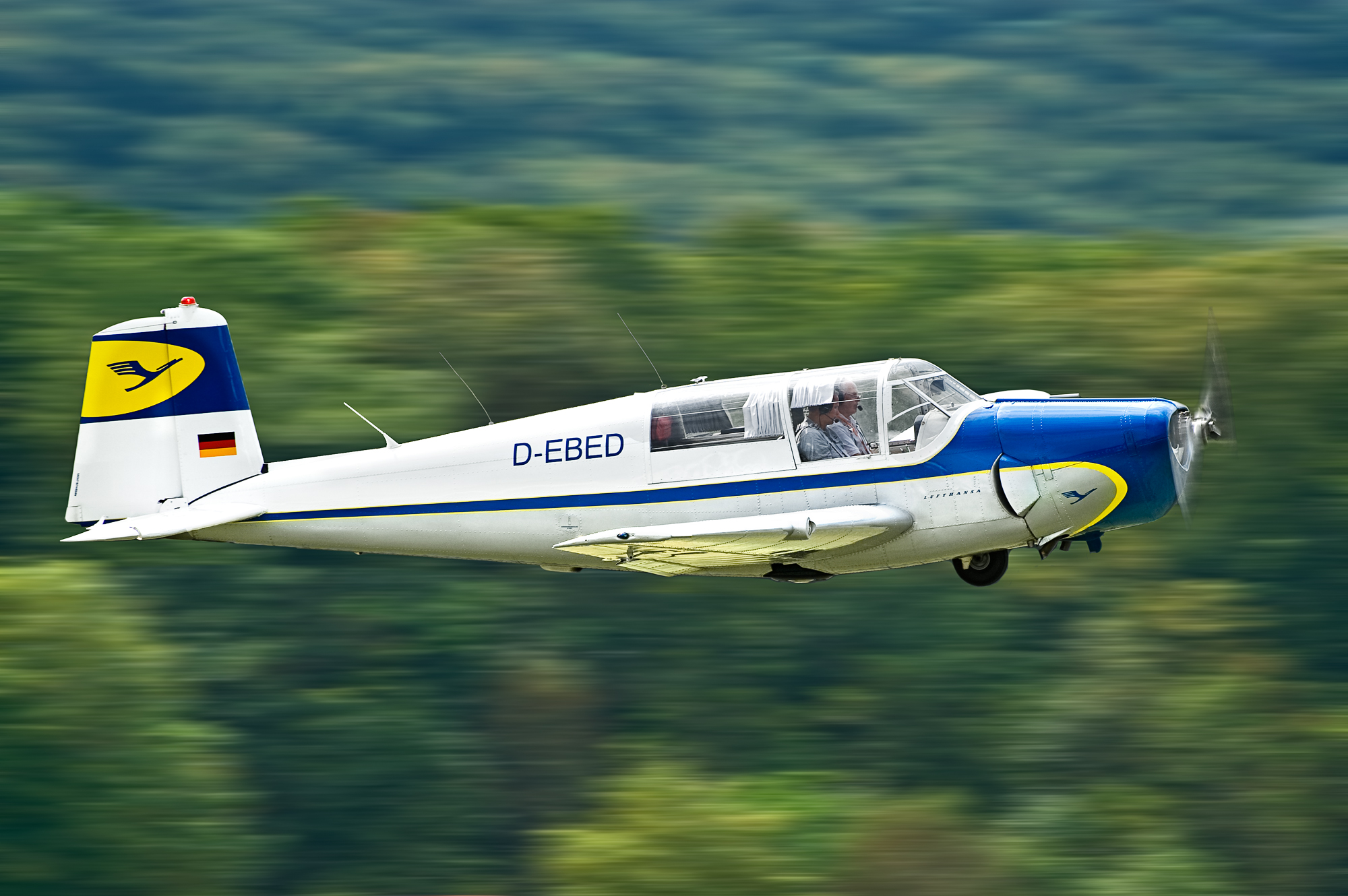
Saab Safir 91B trainer airplane shortly after takeoff from Hahnweide airfield

- Saab 90 Scandia (32 passenger short-/medium-haul aircraft: manufactured 1946–1954, 18 built)
- Saab 91 Safir (single engine trainer: manufactured 1946–1966, 323 built)
- MFI-15 Safari/MFI-17 Supporter (single engine trainer: manufactured 1971 – late 1970s, ca 250 built)
- Saab 340 (30–35 passenger short-haul aircraft: manufactured 1983–1999, 459 built)
- Saab 2000 (50–58 passenger high-speed turboprop airliner: manufactured 1992–1999, 63 built)

=== Experimental aircraft ===
- Saab 210 (experimental aircraft: manufactured 1952, 1 built)
- Saab/Linköping University Generic Future Fighter.

=== Unmanned aerial vehicles ===
- Saab Skeldar
- Swiss UAV
- Saab A3

=== Missiles ===
- RBS 56B BILL 2
- KEPD 350
- NLAW (shoulder-launched anti-tank)
- RB 04 (anti-ship missile)
- Rb 05 (air-to-surface missile)
- RBS 23
- RBS-15 (surface-to-surface and air-to-surface anti-ship missile)
- RBS-70
- Meteor BVRAAM
- Ground Launched Small Diameter Bomb
- Nimbrix low-cost Counter-UAS missile

=== Naval Combat Management Systems ===
- 9LV Naval Combat Management System

=== Naval Integrated Communication Systems ===
- TactiCall Integrated Communication System

=== Naval Radar Systems ===
- Sea Giraffe 180 (SG180) medium air/surface RADAR

=== Surface Radar Systems ===
- Giraffe 1X
- Giraffe 4A
- ARTHUR (counter-battery radar)

=== Boats ===
- Saalina

== Gallery ==
Production of Saab 17

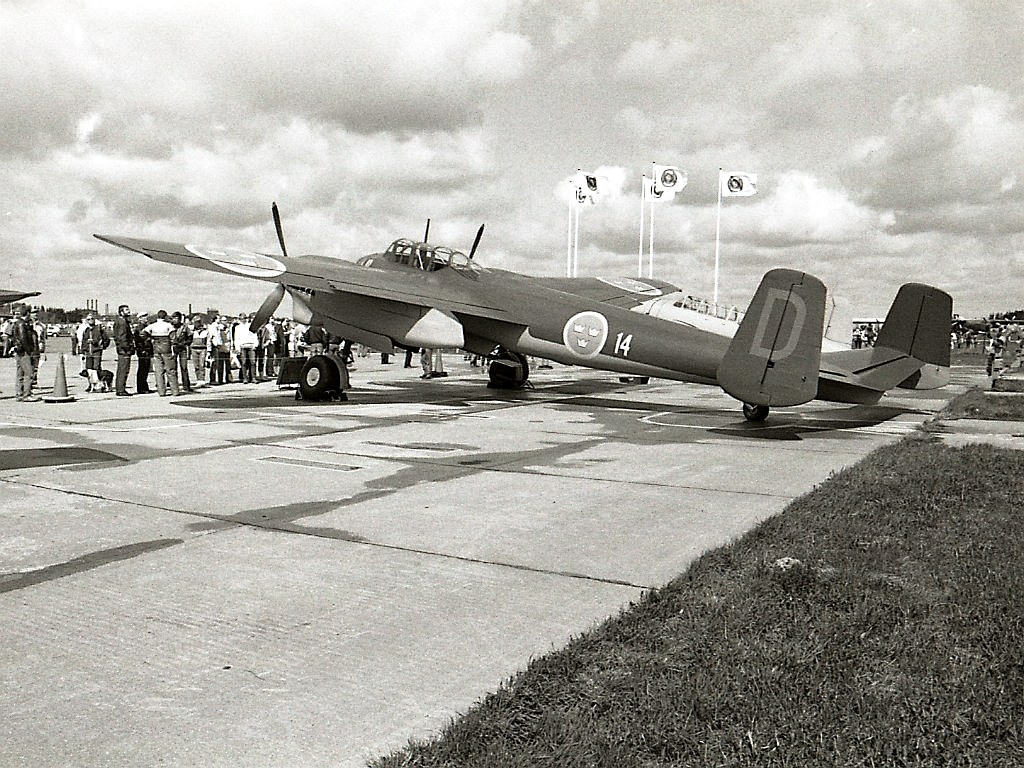
Saab 18B (B 18B)

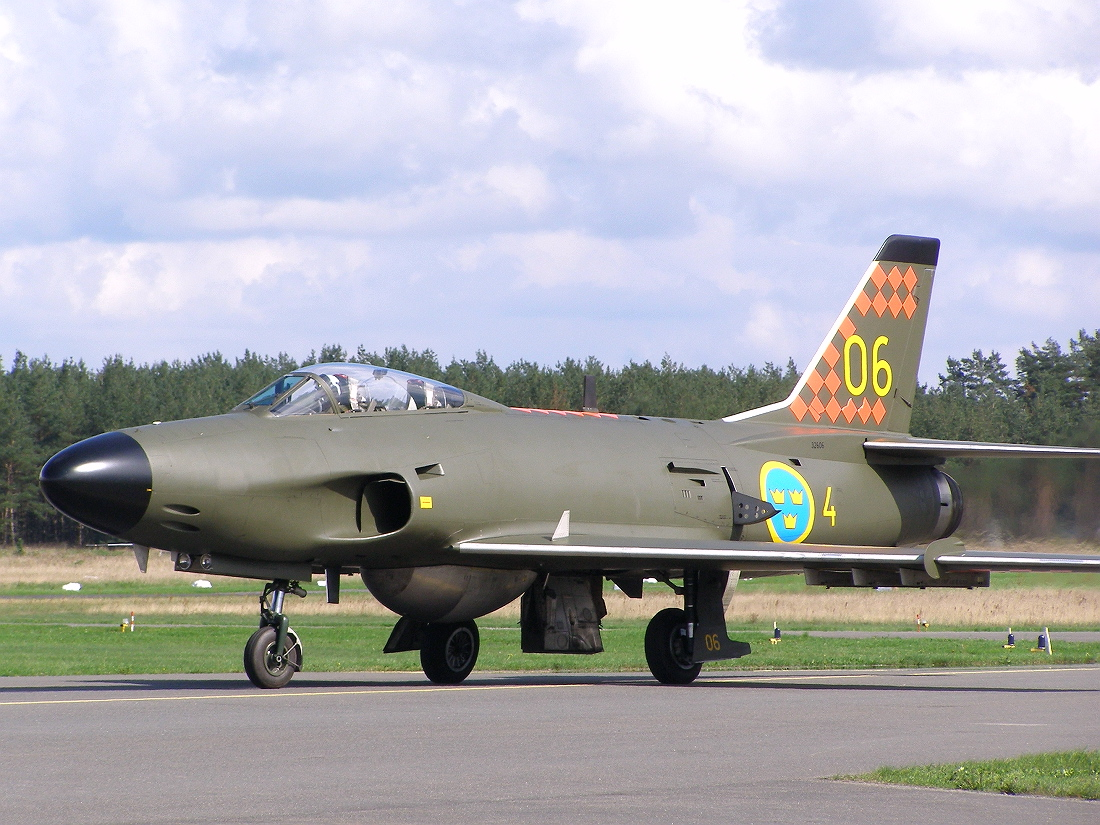
Saab 32 Lansen (J 32B)

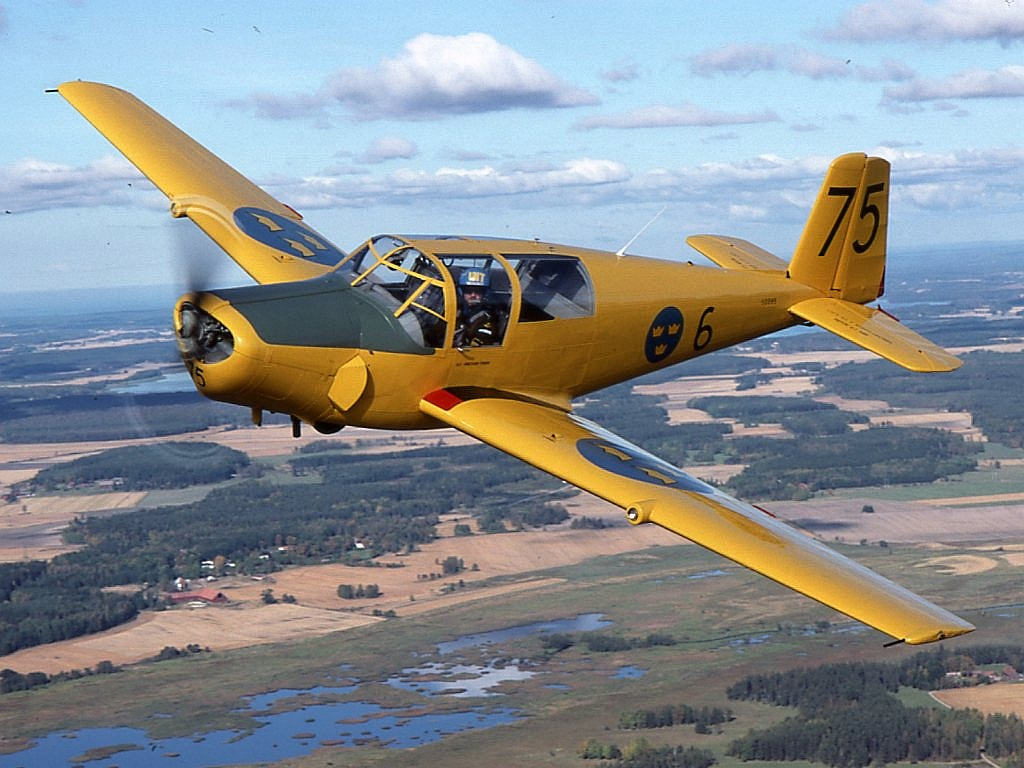
Saab 91C (Sk 50C)

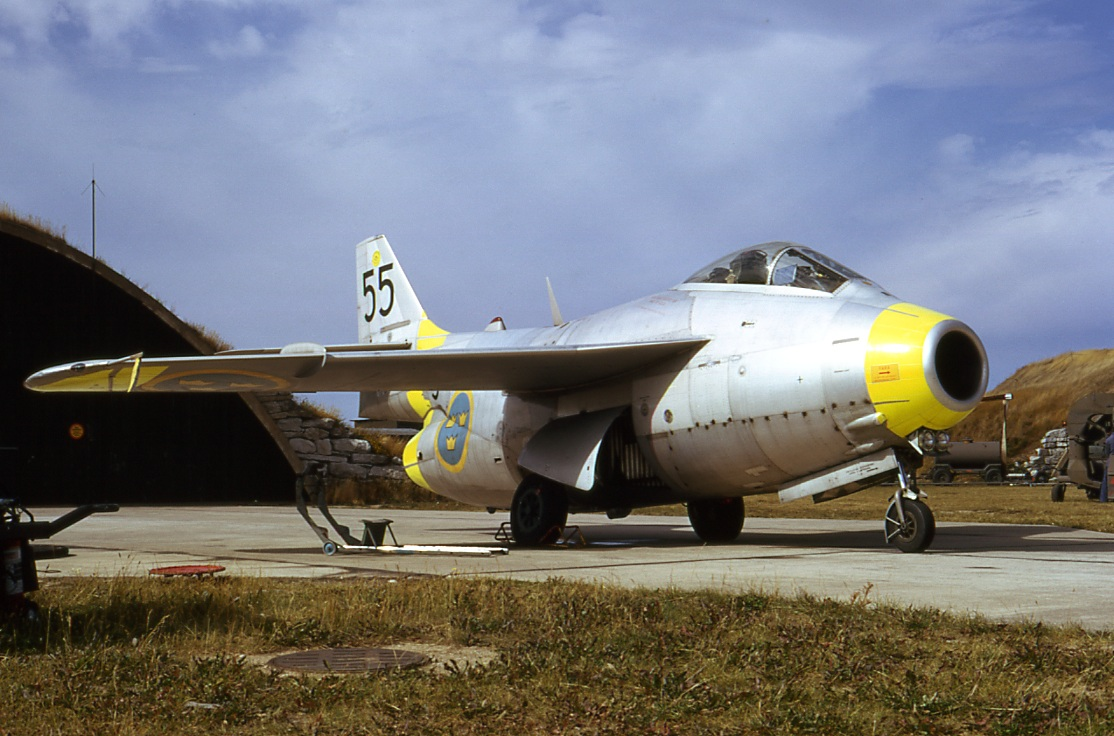
Saab 29 Tunnan (J 29F)

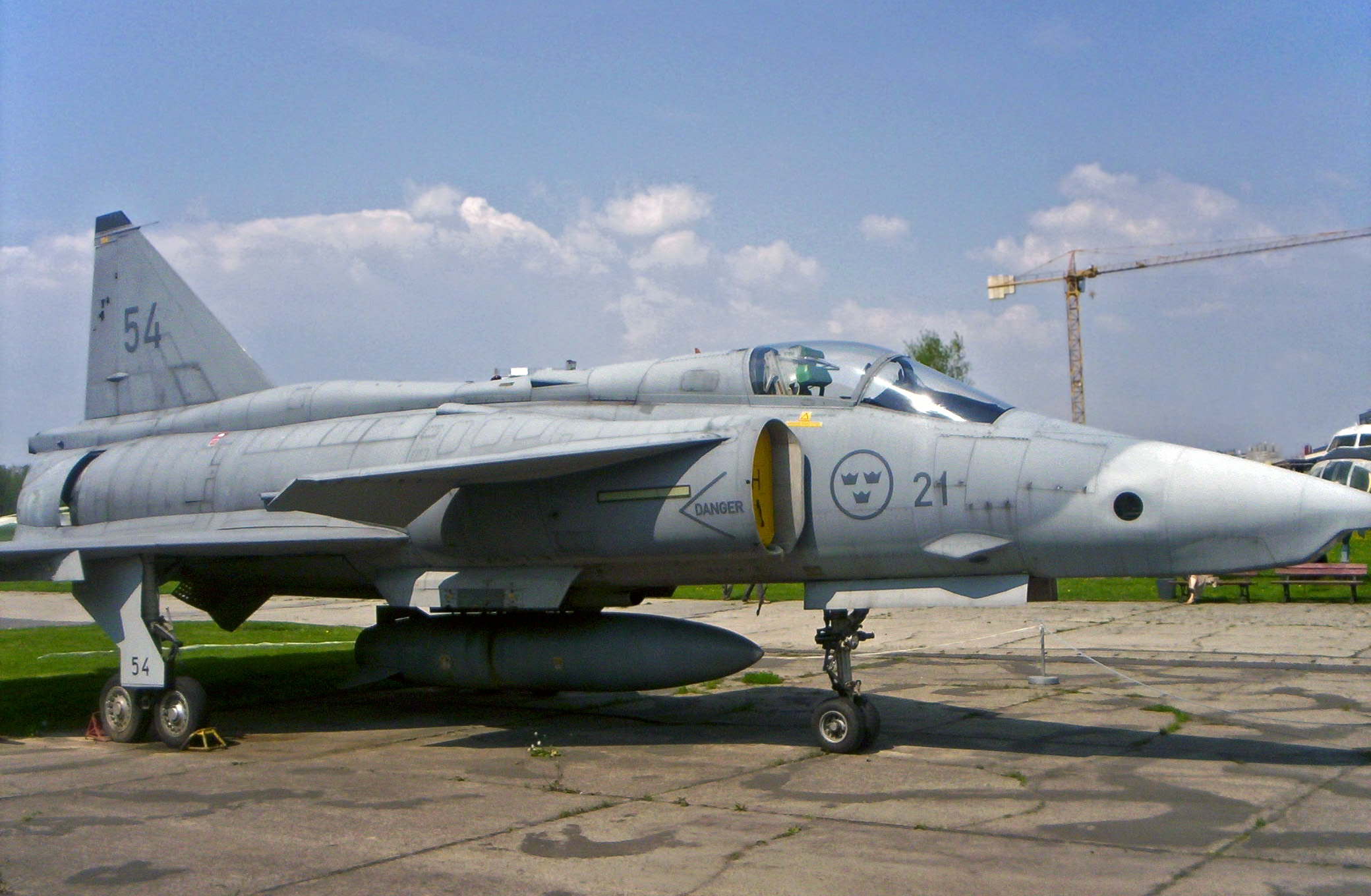
Saab 37 Viggen (SF 37)

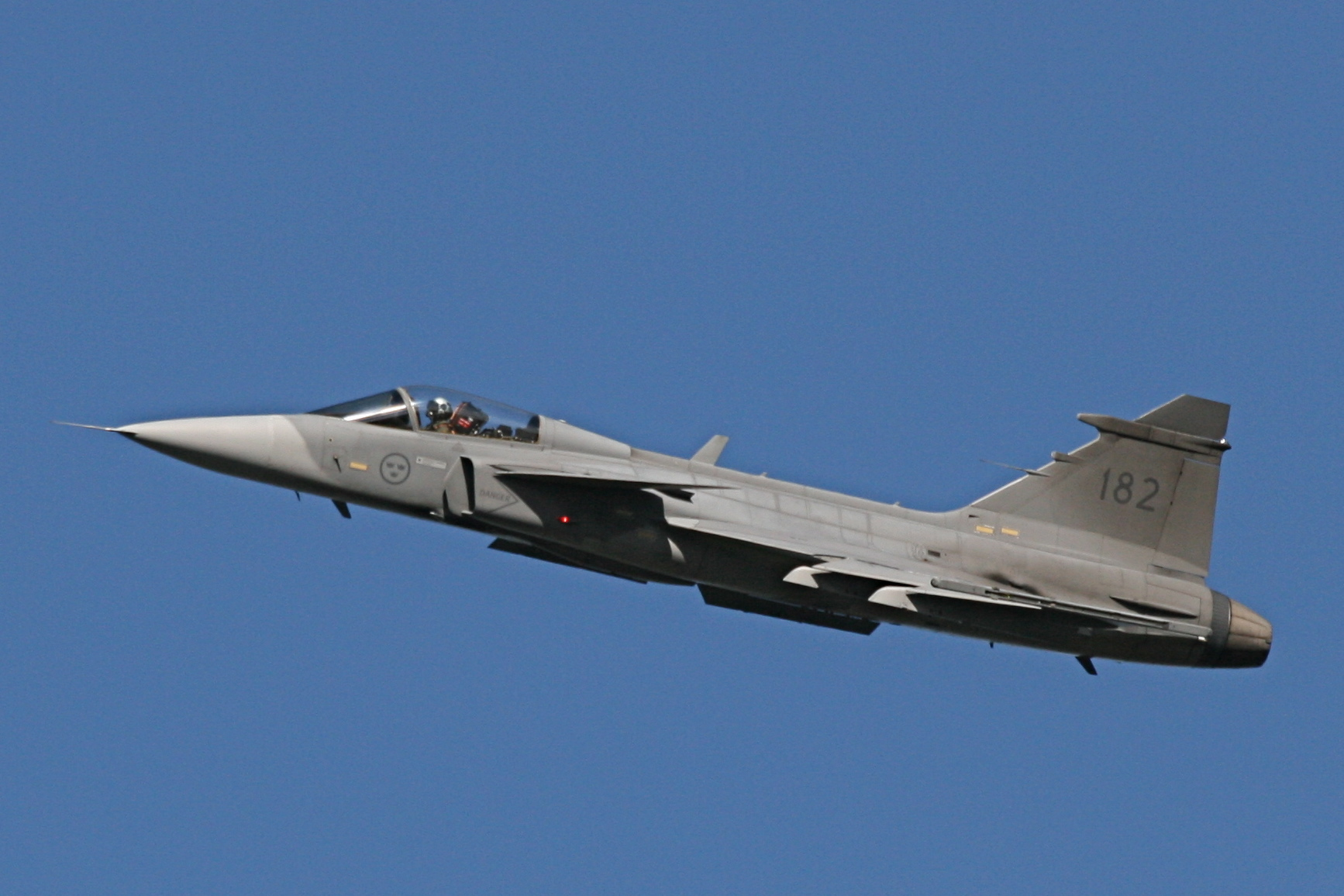
Saab Gripen (JAS 39)

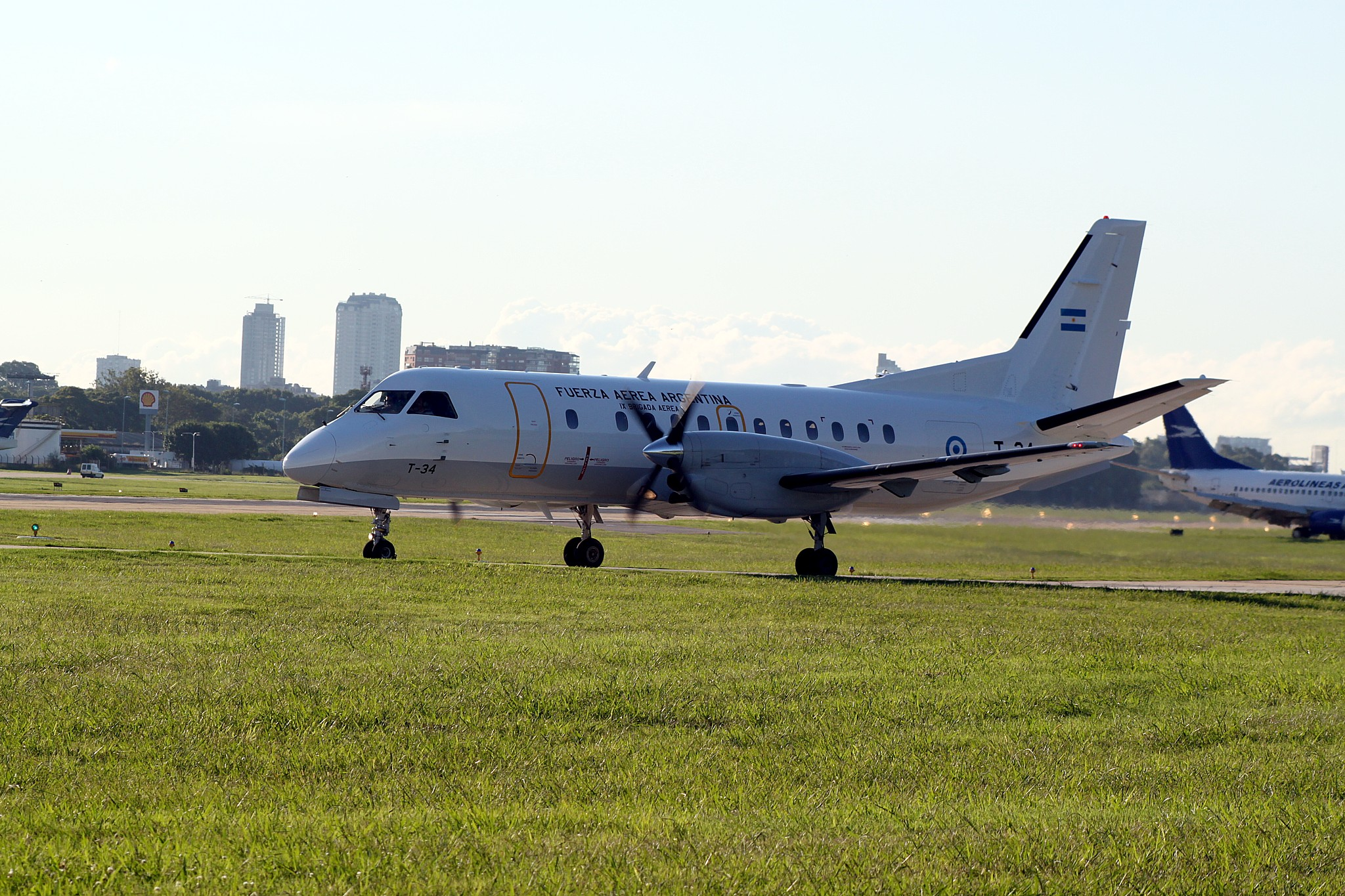
Saab 340B

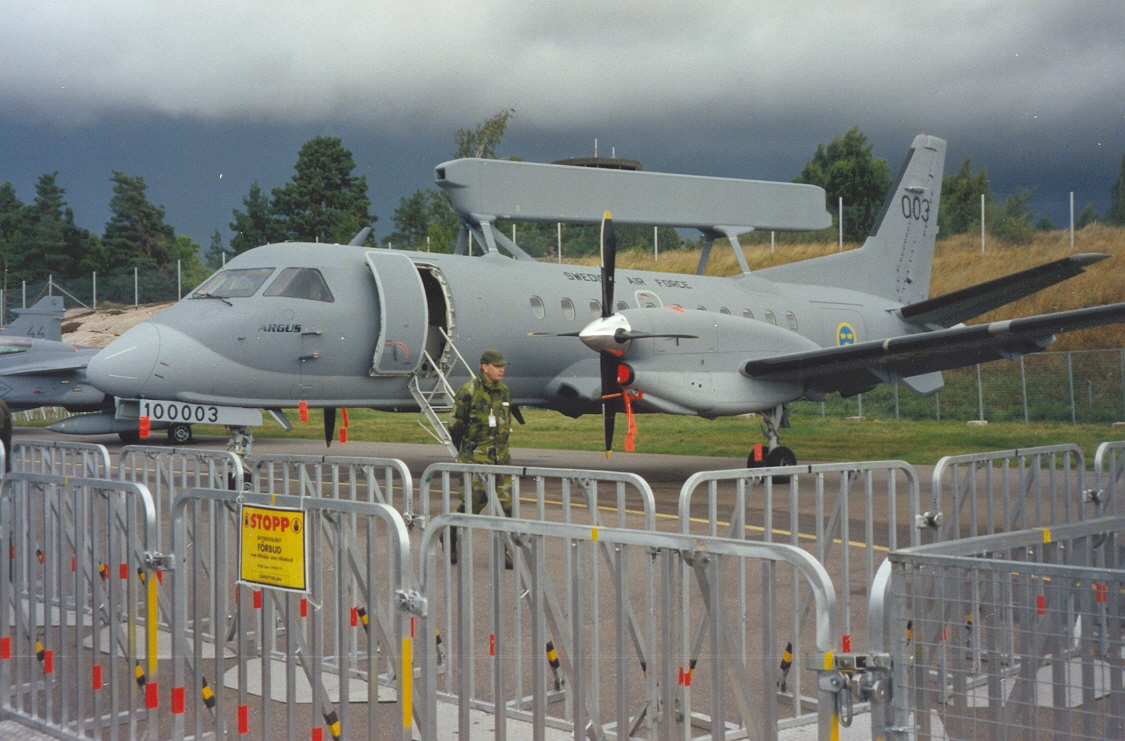
Saab 340 with Erieye radar

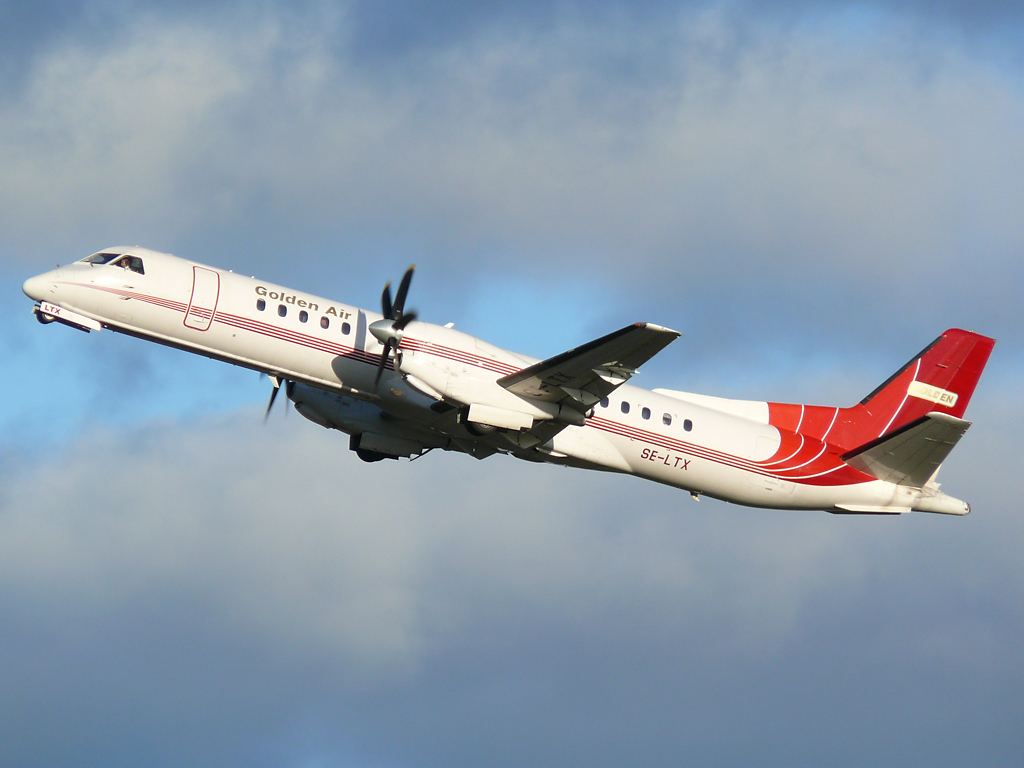
Saab 2000

== See also ==
- Datasaab
- List of Swedish aircraft
- Saab Automobile
- Saab Training and Simulation

== Bibliography ==
- Gunston, Bill (2005). World Encyclopedia of Aircraft Manufacturers (2nd ed.). Phoenix Mill, Gloucestershire, ENG, UK: Sutton Publishing. ISBN 0-7509-3981-8.
- MacPhaily, Doug; Östberg, Mikael (2003), Triple Crown BT-9: The ASJA/Saab Sk 14, A Pictorial Essay (in English and Swedish), San Josef, BC/Dundee, On: DCF Flying Books.
