= Rotortec Cloud Dancer Light =

German autogyro

Cloud Dancer Light

General information
- Type: Autogyro
- National origin: Germany
- Manufacturer: Rotortec
- Status: In production (2013)

History
- Developed from: Rotortec Cloud Dancer I

The Rotortec Cloud Dancer Light is a German autogyro, designed and produced by Rotortec of Görisried, Allgäu. The aircraft is supplied as a complete ready-to-fly-aircraft.

== Design and development ==
Based on the enclosed cockpit Rotortec Cloud Dancer I, the Cloud Dancer Light was designed as a lower cost model for the German 120 kg ultralight class. It features a single two-bladed rotor, a single-seat open cockpit without a windshield, tricycle landing gear with wheel pants and a twin cylinder, liquid-cooled 70 hp (52 kW) Hirth 3503 two stroke engine mounted in pusher configuration.

The aircraft fuselage frame is made from aluminum, while the tail is Kevlar composites. Its 7.10 m (23.3 ft) diameter rotor has a chord of 17.5 cm (6.9 in). The instrument panel is mounted in a simple pod. The aircraft has an empty weight of 120 kg (265 lb) and a gross weight of 300 kg (661 lb), giving a useful load of 180 kg (397 lb).

== Specifications (Cloud Dancer Light) ==
Data from Bayerl

General characteristics

- Crew: one
- Empty weight: 120 kg (265 lb)
- Gross weight: 300 kg (661 lb)
- Fuel capacity: 25 litres (5.5 imp gal; 6.6 US gal)
- Powerplant: 1 × Hirth 3503 two stroke liquid-cooled aircraft engine, 52 kW (70 hp)
- Main rotor diameter: 7.10 m (23 ft 4 in)
- Propellers: 3-bladed composite Helix-Carbon propeller

Performance

- Maximum speed: 155 km/h (96 mph, 84 kn)
- Cruise speed: 120 km/h (75 mph, 65 kn)
- Rate of climb: 5 m/s (980 ft/min)
