= 3502 =

3502 may refer to:

- The year in the 36th century
- 3502 Huangpu asteroid
- Hirth 3502 two stroke aircraft engine
