= Rotortec Cloud Dancer II =

German autogyro

Cloud Dancer II
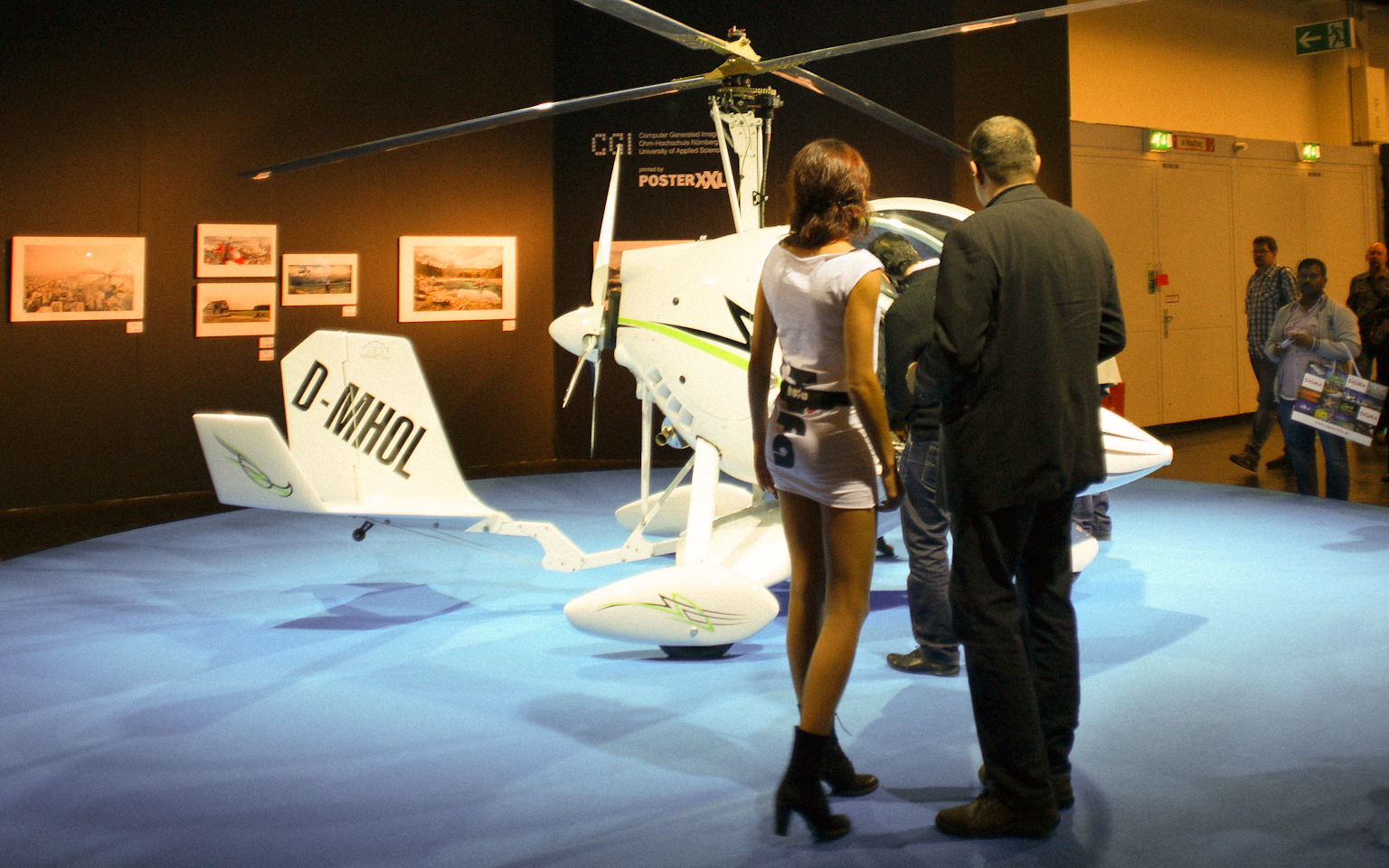

General information
- Type: Autogyro
- National origin: Germany
- Manufacturer: Rotortec
- Designer: Jochen Steinbeck
- Status: In production (2013)

History
- Introduction date: 2009

The Rotortec Cloud Dancer II is a German autogyro, designed by Jochen Steinbeck and produced by Rotortec of Görisried, Allgäu. The aircraft was first shown at AERO Friedrichshafen in 2009 and is supplied as a complete ready-to-fly-aircraft.

== Design and development ==
The Cloud Dancer II features a single four-bladed main rotor, a two-seats in side-by-side configuration enclosed cockpit, tricycle landing gear with wheel pants and a twin cylinder, air-cooled, four-stroke, turbocharged 135 hp (101 kW) Rotortec MPE engine that was developed in-house and is mounted in pusher configuration. It drives a three-bladed composite propeller though a planetary reduction drive.

The aircraft fuselage and the three vertical surface tail are made from aluminum and Kevlar composites. Its 6.7 m (22.0 ft) diameter rotor has a chord of 17.5 cm (6.9 in) and is equipped with a micro-processor controlled hydraulic pre-rotator. The prototype aircraft mounted a three-bladed main rotor, but this was changed to a four-bladed unit during development. The four-bladed rotor provides improved vibration levels, but at the cost of requiring larger space for storage. An electronic touchscreen instrument panel is standard equipment. The aircraft has an empty weight of 248.5 kg (548 lb) and a gross weight of 450 kg (992 lb), giving a useful load of 201.5 kg (444 lb). The fuel tanks hold 115 litres (25 imp gal; 30 US gal), giving a full fuel payload of 120 kg (265 lb).

== Aircraft on display ==
- Hubschraubermuseum Bückeburg

== Specifications (Cloud Dancer II) ==
Data from Bayerl

General characteristics

- Crew: one
- Capacity: one passenger
- Empty weight: 248.5 kg (548 lb)
- Gross weight: 450 kg (992 lb)
- Fuel capacity: 115 litres (25 imp gal; 30 US gal)
- Powerplant: 1 × Rotortec MPE twin cylinder, four stroke, turbocharged aircraft engine, 101 kW (135 hp)
- Main rotor diameter: 6.7 m (22 ft 0 in)
- Propellers: 3-bladed composite

Performance

- Maximum speed: 190 km/h (120 mph, 100 kn)
- Cruise speed: 165 km/h (103 mph, 89 kn)
- Rate of climb: 6 m/s (1,200 ft/min)
