= Rotortec =

German aircraft manufacturer

Rotortec GmbH
- Company type: Privately held company
- Industry: Aerospace
- Key people: Jochen Steinbeck
- Products: Autogyros
- Website: www.rotortec.com

Rotortec GmbH is a German aircraft manufacturer based in Görisried, Allgäu. The company was founded by Jochen Steinbeck and specializes in the design and manufacture of autogyros.

The company's initial design was the Rotortec Cloud Dancer I, a single-seat, enclosed cockpit gyro, that uses an innovative electromagnetic clutch for the Carden Drive. This was followed into production by the two-seats in side-by-side configuration Rotortec Cloud Dancer II, which was first shown at AERO Friedrichshafen in 2009. The third design, the Rotortec Cloud Dancer Light, is a simplified version of the Cloud Dancer I, without a cockpit fairing and intended to qualify for the German 120 kg ultralight class as it has an empty weight of 120 kg (265 lb).

All designs are supplied complete and ready-to-fly.

== Aircraft ==
Summary of aircraft built by Rotortec
Model name	First flight	Number built	Type
Rotortec Cloud Dancer I			single seat enclosed cockpit autogyro
Rotortec Cloud Dancer II	2009		two seat enclosed cockpit autogyro
Rotortec Cloud Dancer Light			single seat open cockpit autogyro for the German 120 kg ultralight class
