= 3503 =

3503 may refer to:

- The year in the 36th century
- 3503 Brandt asteroid
- Hirth 3503 two stroke aircraft engine
