= Hubschraubermuseum Bückeburg =

Coordinates: 52°15′41″N 9°02′49″E

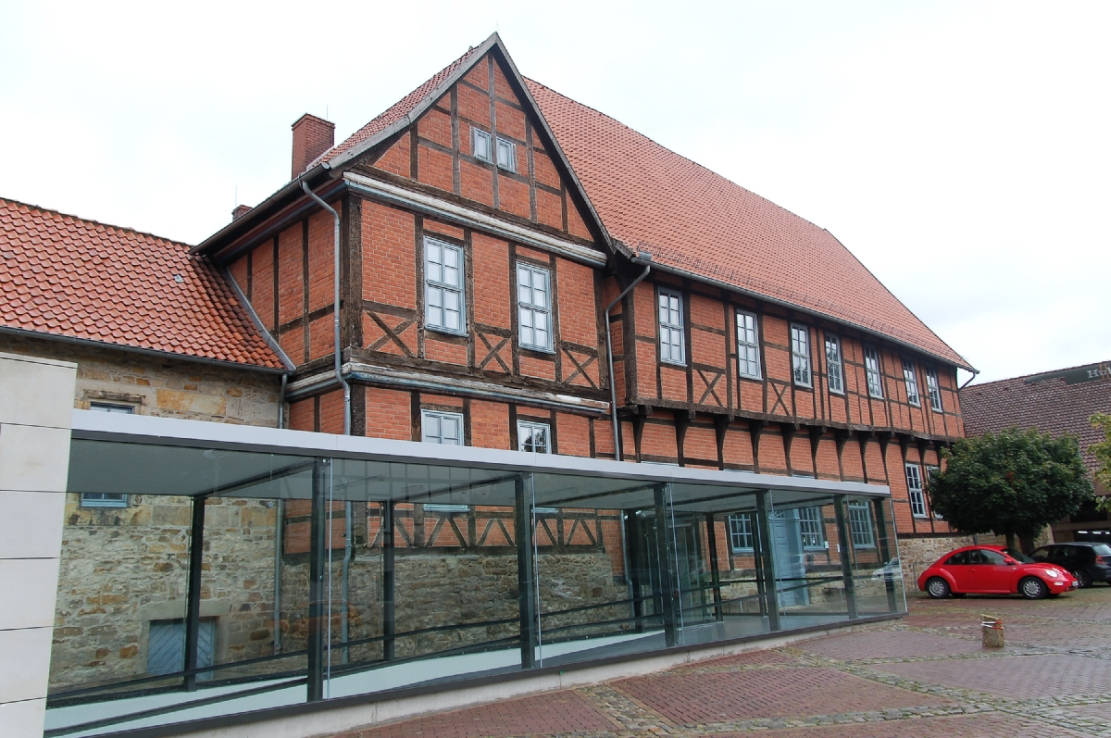
- Established: 1971
- Location: Bückeburg, Lower Saxony
- Type: Aviation museum
- Visitors: > 22,000 (2023)
- Director: Dieter Bals
- Website: www.hubschraubermuseum.de (English)

The Hubschraubermuseum Bückeburg (Bückeburg Helicopter Museum) is located in the German town of Bückeburg, 30 miles (50 km) to the west of Hanover. The museum is the sole museum in Germany specialising in rotary-wing flight and one of few worldwide. The museum is dedicated to the history and technology of the helicopter.

== History ==
Sergeant Major Werner Noltemeyer gathered parts, models, books and photographs of rotary-wing aircraft while he was training to become a helicopter pilot in the German Army Aviation Corps. In 1959 the German School of Army Aviation was established in Bückeburg. In the late 1960s, the city council of Bückeburg offered Noltemeyer an old timbered-framed building for use as a museum which opened in 1971. Due to a shortage of space an additional exhibition hall was added in 1980. The museum was further expanded with a glass addition in 2011.

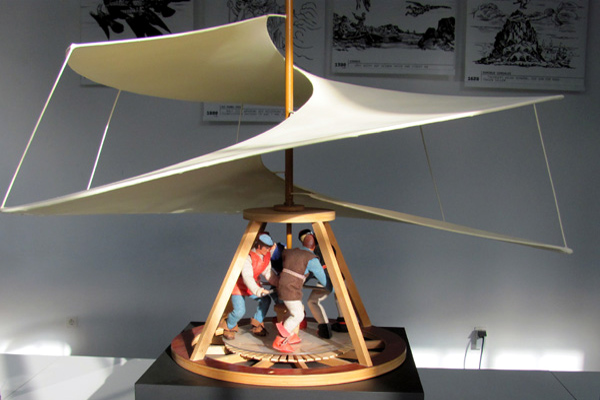
Model of Leonardo da Vinci's aerial screw invention

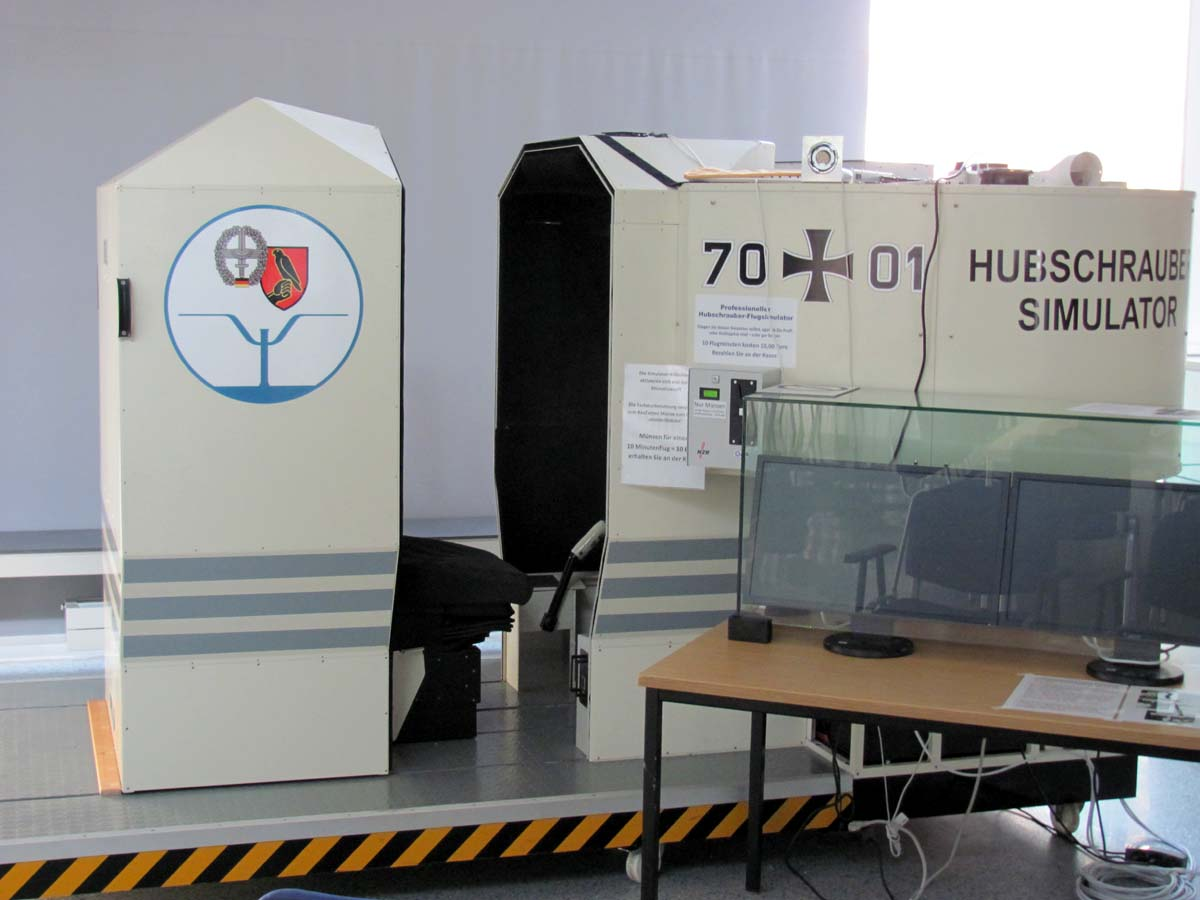
Helicopter Simulator for virtual flights by visitors

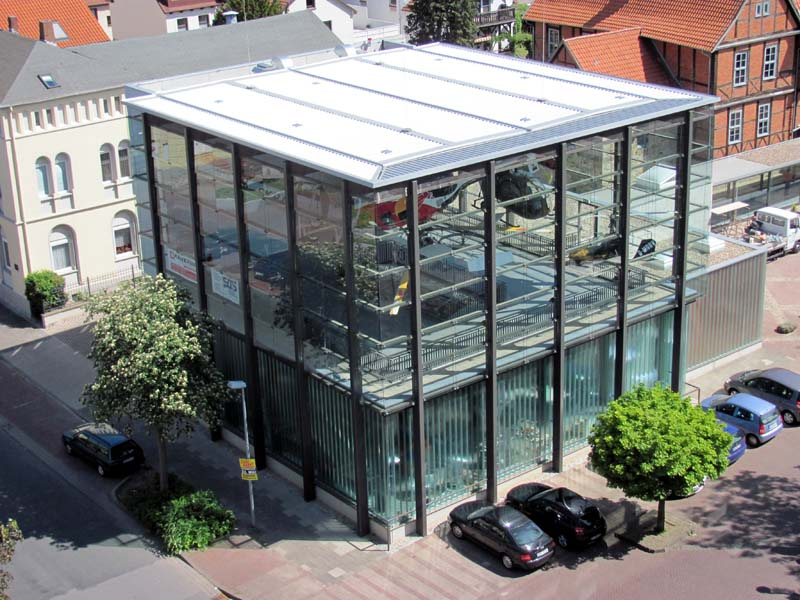
New cubic building in 2011

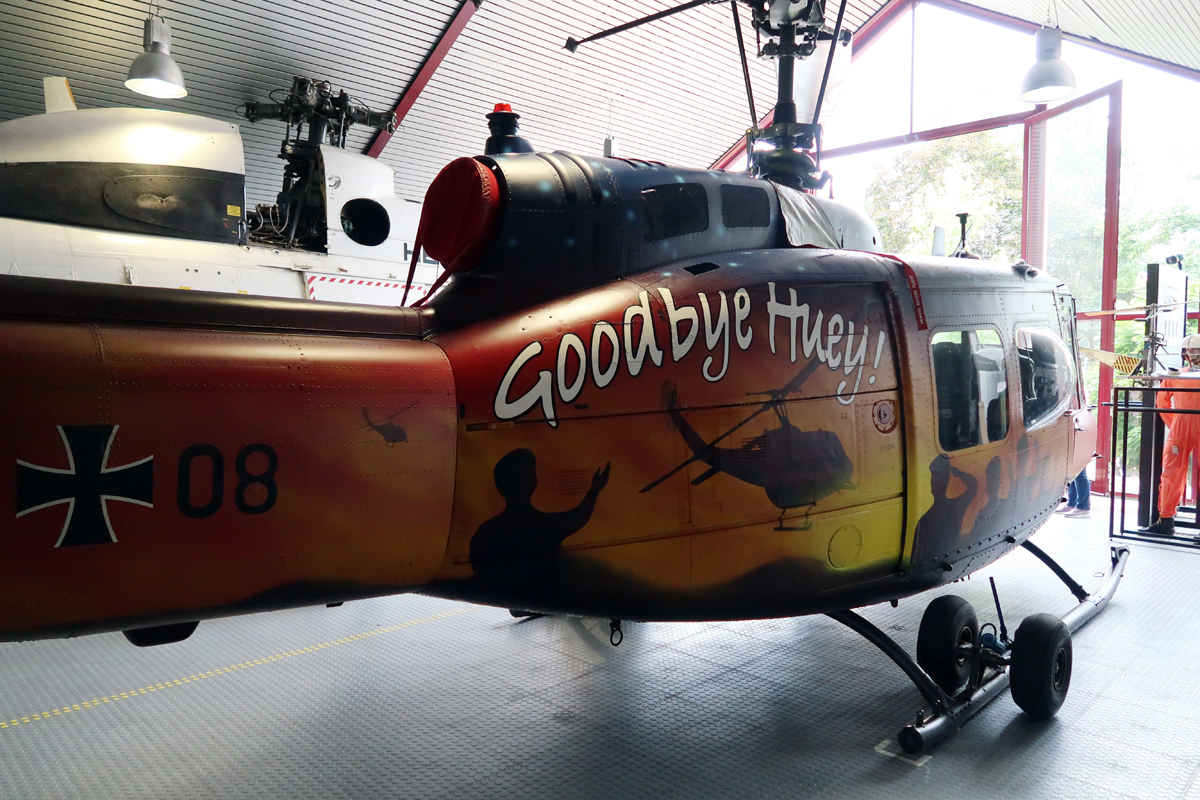
Last Bell UH-1D of the German Army Aviation Corps – Goodbye Huey –, has landed at the Helicopter Museum on 20 July 2021.

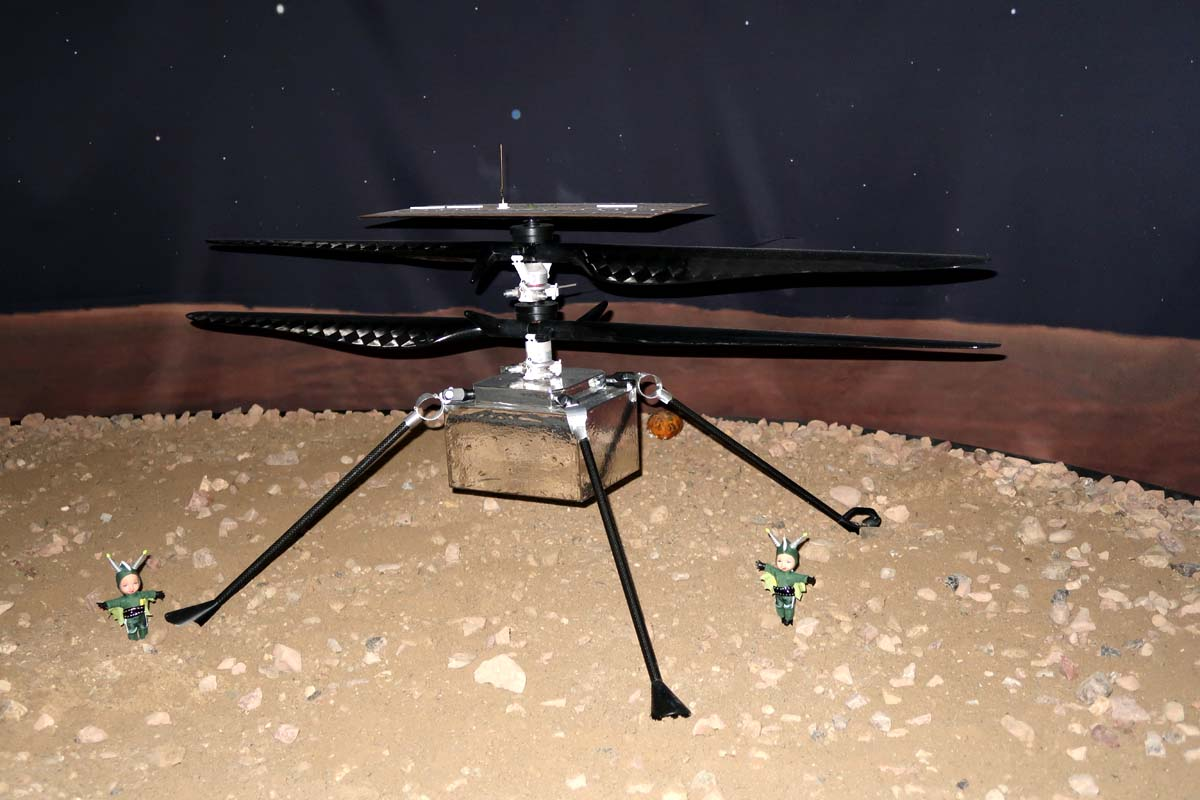
Mars Helicopter Ingenuity – full-scale model in the Helicopter Museum

== Hubschrauberzentrum e. V. ==
The Hubschrauberzentrum e. V. (Helicopter Centre Association) - founded in 1970 - is an organisation of volunteers that operates and maintains the museum. The association maintains an extensive archive and a library for scientific study of the history of rotorcraft.

== Exhibits ==
Displayed in the museum are 53 single and multi-rotor helicopters, gyrocopters, gyrodynes and drones as well as numerous helicopter models, historical photos, working models of rotors, technical demonstration and teaching material, parts, tools or equipment for helicopters (status April 2023). A helicopter simulator is available for museum visitors.

=== Single-rotor helicopters ===
Exhibits include the following helicopter types:

- Aérospatiale Alouette III (SA 316B)
- Aérospatiale SA 330J Puma
- Bell 47 G2 Sioux
- Bell UH-1D „Iroquois“, last Helicopter from this type of the German Army Aviation Corps with special paint „Goodbye Huey“
- Bölkow Bo 46
- Bölkow Bo 102
- Bölkow Bo 103
- Bölkow Bo 103 V3 (Prototype)
- Bölkow P166/3 Flying Jeep
- Bristol 171 Sycamore Mk. 52
- Eurocopter Dauphin SA 365 C3
- Eurocopter EC-665 Tiger (prototype No 3)
- Georges G-1 Papillon (home-made experimental helicopter)
- Georges G-2 (home-made experimental helicopter)
- Havertz HZ-5 (home-made helicopter)
- Heimbächer No 4
- Hiller H-23C Raven
- Hughes TH-55 Osage
- MBB Bo 105 P-1A1 anti-tank helicopter
- MBB Bo 105 CB-4 „The Flying Bulls“
- MBB/Eurocopter Bo 108
- MBB/Kawasaki BK 117
- Merckle SM 67
- Mil Mi-1
- Mil Mi-2
- Nagler-Rolz NR 54 (replica)
- Saunders-Roe Skeeter
- Siemetzki ASRO
- Sikorsky S-58 / H-34)
- Sud Aviation Alouette II (SE 3130)
- Sud-Ouest SO 1221 Djinn

=== Multi-rotor helicopters ===
- Aerotechnik WGM 21
- Cornu No II (first successful helicopter flight on 13 November 1907 - replica)
- Focke-Wulf Fw 61 (replica)
- Goslich Pedalcopter
- Hiller VZ-1 Pawnee ("Flying Platform" - replica)
- Ingenuity (replica of the small helicopter being test flown on Mars, April 2021 - present)
- Kaman HH-43 Huskie
- Kamov Ka-26
- Vertol V-43 / H-21 C
- Wagner Rotocar (combination between car and helicopter)

=== Gyrocopters ===
- Air & Space 18A Flymobil
- Bensen Gyrocopter B-8-M
- Derschmidt Gyrocopter
- Focke-Achgelis Fa 330 Wagtail
- Krauss Autogiro TRS 1
- Rotortec Cloud Dancer I
- Rotortec Cloud Dancer II
- Saalbach home-made Gyrocopter

=== Gyrodynes ===
- VFW-Fokker H2
- VFW-Fokker H3 Sprinter

=== Drones ===
- microdrones md4-1000
- UMS Group R-350 Police Drone

=== Helicopter simulator ===
- for virtual flights by visitors

== See also ==
- American Helicopter Museum, Pennsylvania, USA
- Classic Rotors Museum, California, USA
- The Helicopter Museum, Somerset, England

Related lists

- List of aerospace museums
