= Bölkow Bo 46 =

Experimental high-speed helicopter

Bo 46
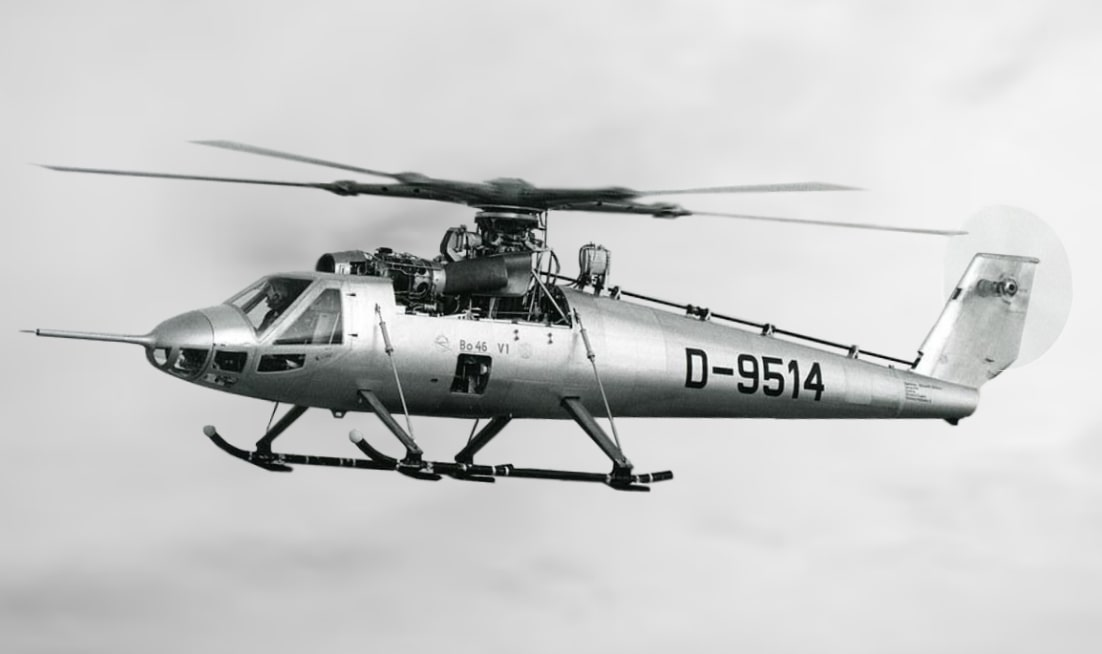
- Bo 46 conducting a hovering test

General information
- Type: Experimental high-speed helicopter
- National origin: West Germany
- Manufacturer: Bölkow
- Number built: 3

History
- First flight: 30 January 1964

The Bölkow Bo 46 was a West German experimental helicopter built to test the Derschmidt rotor system that aimed to allow much higher speeds than traditional helicopter designs. Wind tunnel testing showed promise, but the Bo 46 demonstrated a number of problems and added complexity that led to the concept being abandoned. The Bo 46 was one of a number of new designs exploring high-speed helicopter flight that were built in the early 1960s.

== Background ==
Helicopter rotors operate in a much more challenging environment than a normal aircraft propeller. To start with, helicopters normally use the main rotor both for lift and manoeuvrability, whereas fixed-wing aircraft normally use separate surfaces for these tasks. Pitch and roll are operated by changing the lift on different sides of the rotor, using a system of bell cranks to adjust the blades to different angles of attack as they rotate. To roll to the right, the blades are adjusted so there is slightly more angle of attack on the front and slightly less on the back, resulting in reorienting the rotor thrust to roll the aircraft in the desired direction. The reason the blades are adjusted in the front and back instead of right and left is due to phase lag caused by precession.

In forward flight, the rotor system is subject to various forms of differential loading. Imagine a rotor system where the tips of the blades rotate at 300 km/h relative to still air. When that helicopter is hovering in still air, the blades see the same 300 km/h relative wind throughout their rotation. However, when the helicopter starts to move forward its speed is added to the speed of the blades as they advance towards the front of the aircraft, and subtracted as they retreat. For instance, if the helicopter is flying forward at 100 km/h, the advancing blades see 300 + 100 km/h = 400 km/h, and for the retreating ones its 300 – 100 km/h = 200 km/h.

In this example, the relative airspeed changes by a factor of two during every rotation. Lift is a function of the angle of the airfoil to the relative airflow combined with the speed of the air. To counteract this change in lift, which would normally pitch the aircraft, the rotor system has to dynamically adjust the angle of attack of the airfoils to ensure they generate a steady amount of lift throughout their motion. This adjustment is in addition to any that is being applied deliberately to manoeuvre. Since every control system has some mechanical limit, as the aircraft speeds up it loses manoeuvrability.

Drag is a function of the square of airspeed, so the same changes in speed cause the drag to vary by a factor of four. To reduce the net force as much as possible, helicopter blades are designed to be as thin as possible, reducing their drag. In the 1950s, helicopter blades were made in much the same fashion as fixed-wing aircraft wings; a spar ran the length of the rotor blade and provided most of the structural strength, while a series of stringers give it the proper aerodynamic shape. This method of construction, given the materials of the era, placed enormous stresses on the spar.

To lessen the loads, especially the rapid changes, the rotor hubs included a system of bearings that allow the blades to move forward or back in response to drag, and up and down in a flapping motion in response to changing speed. These were in addition to the system used to change the angle of attack to provide control; rotor hubs tended to be very complex.

== Performance limits ==
From an elementary aeronautical point of view, there exists two main problems regarding the maximum airspeed of a helicopter as imposed by its rotor system.

All wings require a certain amount of air to flow over its surface in order to generate lift. The inherent flight mechanics of a helicopter not at hover will result in a portion of the rotating blade disk to "see" a lower airspeed relative to the direction of travel. As the speed of the fuselage in the commanded direction increases, there will be a decrease in relative airspeed of the retreating blades. A conventional helicopter will reach a hard limit in terms of maximum speed when the relative airspeed of the retreating blades decays to near zero thus resulting in retreating blade stall.

One solution to this problem is to increase the rotor rpm so that the relative airspeed of the retreating blades are higher. However, this solution also has its limits. As any airfoil approaches the speed of sound it encounters a problem known as wave drag. Airfoils designed for subsonic flight will experience a significant increase in drag if they are subjected to transonic or higher airspeeds. If the rotor rpm were to be increased in an attempt to alleviate retreating blade stall, the helicopter will face a maximum speed induced by extreme drag of the rotor' advancing blades as their tips approach supersonic relative airspeed.

Thus, in summary; If main rotor rpm is too low, the speed at which the retreating blade sections stall will be the maximum speed limit. If the main rotor rpm is too high, the speed at which the advancing blades encounter supersonic airflow would be the maximum speed limit. Even to the casual observer it should be clear that the designer should aim for a balance between these two limits. It should also be mentioned that in addition to these two addressed issues, there are a host of others which also contribute to maximum airspeed limits.

== Derschmidt's solution ==
The basic problem inherent in rotor design is the difference in airspeed for the advancing and retreating blades. Among the many effects this causes is one of interest; the blades rotate forward and backward around the hub as drag increases and decreases. Consider a blade as it reaches the rear of the aircraft and starts to rotate forward; during this time the relative airspeed starts increasing rapidly, and the blade is pushed further and further back by the increasing drag. This force is relieved by a drag bearing. During the brief period while it rotates around this bearing, the overall speed of the blade is decreased, slightly offsetting the speed due to forward motion.

Derschmidt's rotor design deliberately exaggerates this rotation to offset the increase and decrease in speed throughout the blade's rotation. At the same point of rotation as the traditional blade above, a Derschmidt rotor has advanced the blade considerably to an angle of about 40 degrees compared to its rest position straight out from the hub. As the blade continues advancing, a linkage swings the blade from 40 degrees forward to 40 degrees rearward, slowing the tip by about 1/2 the rotational speed. This process is reversed as the blade reaches its forward-most position, increasing the speed of the blade as it retreats.

The resulting motion helps smooth out the relative airspeed seen by the blade. Since the effects of the forward motion of the helicopter are reduced, or even eliminated at lower speeds, the rotor can be spun at a high speed without fear of reaching the wave drag regime. At the same time, the speed of the retreating blade never approaches the stall point. Likewise, changes in drag are even more reduced, to the point of being negligible. This allows the Derschmidt rotor to be a rigid design, eliminating the complex series of bearings, flexible fittings and linkages used in conventional rotors.

Since the motion in the Derschmidt rotor follows the natural change in drag through the rotation, the force applied to the blades to move them into position is quite small. Of the several designs he presented in his early patents, most used a very small linkage from a bell crank on the inner side of the blade attached to a small pushrod for operation. These rods were attached to a disk set eccentrically to the centre of rotation, which drove the blades into their proper locations.

Last in the series of designs was a different approach that used a single counterweight for each blade, geared so its motion was mechanically amplified. The weight was selected to create a harmonic pendulum at the rotor's design speed. There was no mechanical attachment between the blades, and the entire assembly sat outside the hub, leaving ample room for maintenance.

== Bo 46 ==
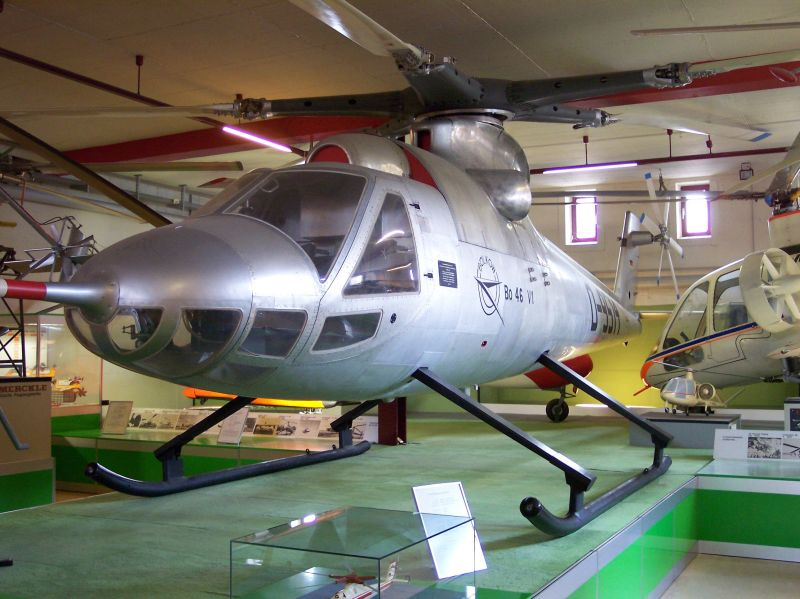
A Bölkow Bo 46 ondeisplay at the Bückeburg Helicopter Museum

Bölkow had been interested in high-speed rotor flight for some time, and had drawn up several experimental concepts based on tip jet systems. Later they took on the job of developing a glass-fibre composite blade that was much stronger than the existing metal designs. When Derschmidt received his first patent in 1955, Bölkow took up the concept and started work on the Bölkow Bo 46 as an experimental testbed, paid for by a Ministry of Defence contract.

The basic Bo 46 design was finalized in January 1959. The five-bladed rotor system was initially tested in a wind tunnel and turned in impressive results. These suggested that the Bo 46 would be able to reach speeds up to 500 km/h (270 kn); even advanced designs of the era were limited to speeds around 250 km/h (130 kn). Construction of three highly streamlined fuselages started at Siebel. There were powered by an 800 hp Turboméca Turmo turboshaft driving a five-bladed Derschmidt rotor. The design originally featured a louvred fenestration for the anti-torque rotor that could be closed in high speed flight, but this was removed from the prototypes and the six-bladed rotor was conventionally mounted on the left side of the tail. The maximum speed was not limited by rotor considerations, but the maximum power of the engine. Adding separate engines for additional forward thrust was expected to allow speeds as high as 700 km/h (380 kn).

During the early 1960s the company also outlined several production designs, most using twin rotors, the largest of these was the Bo 310. This design would be powered by two T55 or T64 engines, each of which drove both a Derschmidt rotor and a forward-facing propeller for additional forward thrust. The engines would be on the ends of an aerofoil section to reduce the rotor loading. Several versions of the Bo 310 were modelled, mostly passenger transports, but also attack helicopter versions. The Bo 310 would have a cruise speed of 500 km/h (270 kn).

Initial test flights of the Bo 46 with the rotors locked started in the autumn of 1963. In testing a series of unexpected new types of dynamic loads were encountered, which led to dangerous oscillations in the rotor. These did not appear to be inherent to the design itself, but they could only be cured through additional complexity in the rotor. During the same period, rotor design was moving to composite blades that were much stronger than the older spar-and-stringer designs, which eliminated the need for the complex bearing system that relieved loads. Although the Derschmidt rotor still improved performance, it appeared the added complexity was not worthwhile.

Interest in the system waned, but research flights continued. The Bo 46 was eventually equipped with two Turboméca Marboré engines, allowing a speed of 400 km/h. The fibreglass bladed rotor proved to be workable however, and would go on to see wide service in the Bölkow Bo 105.

== Logbook Entries of Test Pilot ==
The flight test pilot of the Bo 46 was Wilfried von Engelhardt. His log book entries are as follows:

- February 14, 1964: first attempt to lift off
- October 27, 1964: four successful hovers, duration in total 3 minutes
- October 28, 1964: four successful hovers. Duration in total 18 minutes. Note that the helicopter can be controlled but is sluggish
- October 29, 1964: two landings from higher than 3 Meters. In total 13 minutes of flight time.

== Aircraft on display ==
A preserved example of the Bo 46 is on public display at the Hubschrauber Museum, Bückeburg.

== Specifications (Bo 46) ==
Data from

General characteristics

- Crew: one pilot
- Capacity: 1 passenger/observer
- Gross weight: 2,000 kg (4,400 lb)
- Powerplant: 1 × Turboméca Turmo IIIB turboshaft, 597 kW (800 hp)
- Main rotor diameter: 10.00 m (32 ft 10 in)
- Main rotor area: 78.5 m^{2} (845 sq ft)

Performance

- Maximum speed: 320 km/h (200 mph, 170 kn)

== See also ==
- Sikorsky S-69 Advancing Blade Concept
