= Wilfried von Engelhardt =

Wilfried Baron von Engelhardt (11 September 1928, Liebenberg – 24 January 2015, Linz, Austria) was Chief Test Pilot of MBB, first flight of Bölkow Bo 46 and Bo 105. Fellow SETP. Member of the French Académie de l'air et de l'espace.

== Life ==
Wilfried “Fred” Baron von Engelhardt was born in the Castle of Liebenberg (north of Berlin, Germany) as the great-grandson of Fürst Philip zu Eulenburg. Through his step-father, C.A. von Schoenbeck, who flew as a pilot in World War I in the famous squadron of the "Red Baron" and who was later the Commander of the German Flight Test Center in Rechlin, Fred early on developed a passion for aviation. Young Fred often met with famous German pilots, Hanna Reitsch and Ernst Udet to name a few. While his step-father frequently piloted a Fieseler Fi 156 Storch and would sometimes land on the castle's estate, Fred got attached to helicopters. Back then helicopters were in their infancy. The rotorcraft aerodynamics, not well understood these days, the much more complex mechanism as such and the versatility of helicopters attracted him more than fixed-wing aircraft.

Nevertheless, Fred started out on fixed-wing aircraft. At age 16 he was trained as a glider pilot – the first step towards a seat in a fighter aircraft of the German Luftwaffe. Fred was trained on SG38 and Grunay Baby. He earned his wings in the "Kranich". By October 1944 he held the A, B and C-privileges in his Glider license.

Towards the end of World War II, he continued training and was supposed to fly the Heinkel He 162 "Volksjäger". However, the lack of aviation fuel in the last days of the war prevented that.

His family had to flee to Austria after the war ended, and Fred earned his high school diploma in Linz in 1947. He would definitely have opted for an aerospace program; however; the Allies banned courses on aeronautical engineering at German and Austrian universities. Fred completed a training to become hotel manager instead.

At the time his step-father had the German dealership for Hiller Helicopters. Fred moved to Paris, was taught French at Sorbonne and eventually became an aircraft mechanic. This likely was the most important step towards his professional career as a test pilot.

From 1955 to 1956 Fred then worked as an aircraft mechanic in the Netherlands. It was a small enterprise and he lived on a very small salary. In return, he was allowed to fly the Hiller 12B and eventually became the first commercial helicopter pilot in the Netherlands and Germany. His log book shows his first flight in a Hiller H12B, registration PH-NFL, on August 2, 1954 (Fred had flown fixed wing aircraft before, mainly gliders and – not official - his step-father's “Fieseler Storch”. When starting official fixed wing flight training his flight instructor would let him solo after only 20 minutes of dual instruction).

Fred progressed to flight instructor in 1956 in Paris and earned his living as a flight instructor, for both civilian and military pilots, flying Bell 47 and Djinn helicopters until 1960.

Looking at his flight log the next step in his career brought him to Dutch New-Guinea. He worked there as an operational helicopter pilot from September 26, 1961 to August 3, 1962. In these days Fred worked for S.G.O.N.N.G., flying the Aloutte II to remote locations in a remote part of the world.

Because of his technical background Fred was invited to join the newly created group around Ludwig Bölkow. His mentor was the engineer Hans Derschmidt, a member of the Bölkow group who developed a swept rotor system with variable sweep and who recommended Engelhardt to the company owner Mr. Boelkow (“he is not only a pilot – he also has some solid understanding of helicopter technology”). Boelkow was in need for a test pilot for his Bo 46 project (the Bo 46 employed a novice rotor concept with variable sweep main rotor blades so to achieve higher speeds in forward flight. After his inventor this rotor system is named “Derschmidt Rotor”).

Fred went to Test Pilot School in Istres. In his spare time on weekends he tested French helicopters as a volunteer and graduated as best of class on July 1, 1966 with test pilot certificate No 31. He served as the Chief Test pilot at MBB from 1962 to 1973.

After his career as a test pilot Fred worked as Head of Sales, then Head of Customer Training. This position took him into many parts of the world, among other, Africa and Middle East and he would now pass on his knowledge to younger pilots.

== First flights ==
Wilfried “Fred” von Engelhardt's First Flights:

- Experimental Helicopter Bölkow Bo 46 – testing the swept blade rotor system. First attempt to lift off was on February 14, 1964. This helicopter (only one was flown) is now located in the Rotorcraft Museum in Bückeburg, Germany.
- Utility Helicopter Bo 105 – flight testing the hingeless rotor system. This helicopter is a success story and does not need further introduction. First attempt to lift off was on September 14, 1966 in the Bo 105 V1. The prototype was lost when it entered ground resonance. Fred emerged uninjured and was quoted “that he had lots of room to exit the helicopter”. First flight was on February 16, 1967. According to Fred's logbook this flight lasted from 17:04 to 17:24 LT and was a success.

== Other flights of interest ==
- On July 23, 1957 (Flight #155) when flying the Djinn helicopter on a spraying mission in the Netherlands his helicopter collided with a wire which was not removed by accident. The helicopter looped around the wire and crash landed. Fred emerged with some minor injuries - and got to know the farmer's daughter who assisted in home care and would then become his first wife.
- June 22, 1967: first flight in Alouette III with main rotor blades manufactured from reinforced fibers (GFK)
- September 30, 1960 to October 4, 1960: flights in Bell 47G for the movie „Weisses Rössl“
- November 13, 1967: Flight #1544: first flight with rotor head manufactured from titanium in Bo 105V2
- January 8, 1968, Flight # 1568: Flight with wounded tail rotor
- May 13, 1969 (Flight# 1832): High speed flight testing with Bo 105 V4, registration D-HAPE. The perplex canopy burst into pieces, wounding the flight test engineer and tearing off Fred's helmet.
- September 16, 1969 (Flight# 1895): Emergency landing after failure of the tail rotor control while on a demonstration flight with a Canadian pilot.
- August 10, 1970 (Flight# 2022): Demonstration flight in Bo 105 with Neil Armstrong
- May 24, 1972 (Flight# 2105): Engine failure overflying São Paulo, Brasil, in a Jet Ranger. Successful autorotation to the ground.

== Achievements ==
Together with Sigi Hoffmann, Fred was the first holder of an instrument rating for helicopters in Germany. Fred has held SETP functions in the European part of the society in the past. Despite his age he showed great interest in the activities of the society.

== Last flights ==
Wilfried “Fred” von Engelhardt's Last Flights

- On February 5, 2013, Fred flew a Bo 105 for his last time from Linz to Salzburg and back (Log Book #2344 and #2345), where he gave a speech on development of the Bo 105 on invitation by “Flying Bulls”.
- On April 15, 2014, he was on controls in an EC 135 full motion flight simulator in Donauwörth on invitation by Airbus Helicopters.

After his retirement Wilfried dedicated himself to helping people, in particular those who were disabled. He was an active member in Church and developed and supported an S.O.S Kinderdorf for homeless children. Fred took courses in theology at Linz University and completed an education as a medical professional in Traditional Chinese Medicine. He was very active in the field of anthropology as well.
