= GyroTec DF02 =

German autogyro

DF02
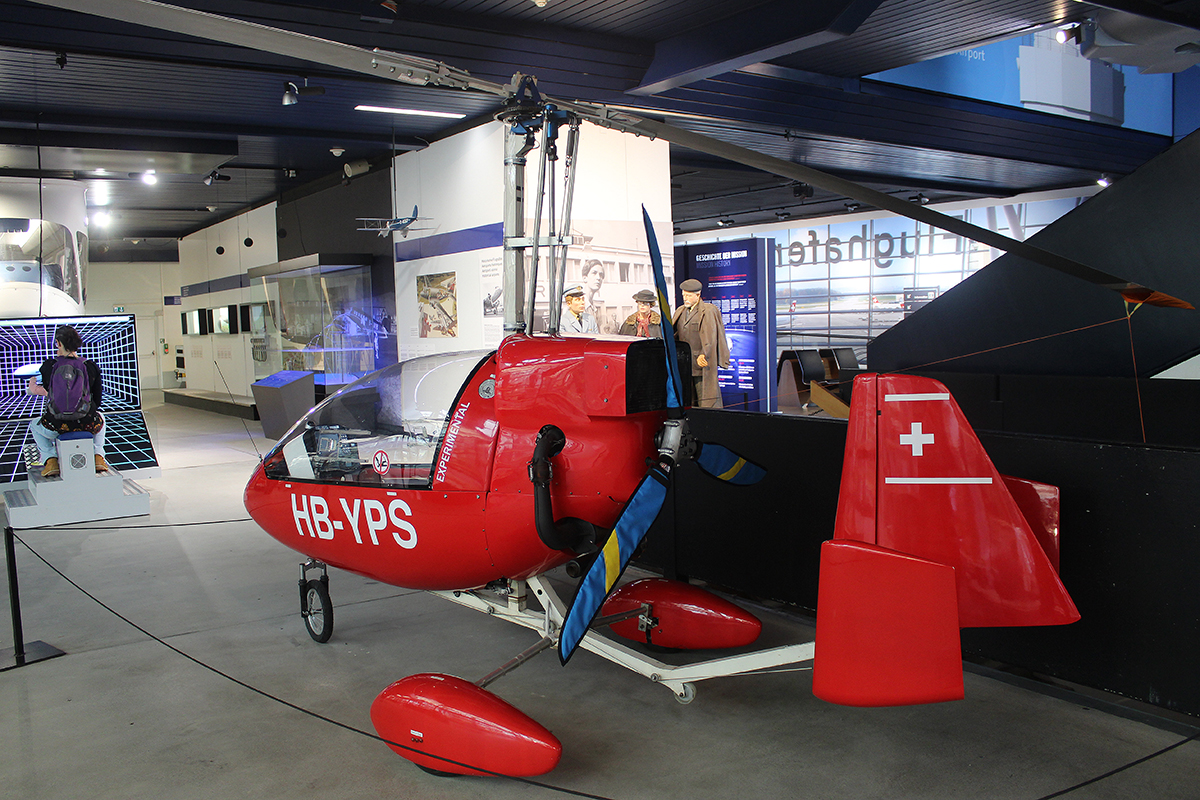

General information
- Type: Autogyro
- National origin: Germany
- Manufacturer: GyroTec Michael Obermaier
- Status: In production (2013)

The GyroTec DF02 is a German autogyro, designed and produced by GyroTec Michael Obermaier of Wörth am Rhein. The DF02 is supplied as complete ready-to-fly-aircraft.

== Design and development ==
The DF02 features a single main rotor, a single-seat enclosed cockpit with an optional bubble canopy, tricycle landing gear and a twin cylinder, liquid-cooled, two-stroke, dual-ignition, fuel-injected 70 hp (52 kW) Hirth 3503 engine in pusher configuration.

The aircraft uses a 7.45 m (24.4 ft) diameter, high-inertia Averso Aviation rotor, with a chord of 21.6 cm (8.5 in). The rotor head was designed by GyroTec and includes a disc-style rotor brake, pre-rotator and integral articulation stops. The DF02 has an empty weight of 175 kg (386 lb) and a gross weight of 300 kg (661 lb), giving a useful load of 125 kg (276 lb).

The bubble canopy can be removed for flight in warm weather. In 2009 the canopy size was increased to accommodate taller pilots.

== Specifications (DF02) ==
Data from Bayerl

General characteristics

- Crew: one
- Empty weight: 175 kg (386 lb)
- Gross weight: 300 kg (661 lb)
- Fuel capacity: 62 litres (14 imp gal; 16 US gal)
- Powerplant: 1 × Hirth 3503 twin cylinder, liquid-cooled, two-stroke, dual-ignition, fuel-injected aircraft engine, 52 kW (70 hp)
- Main rotor diameter: 7.45 m (24 ft 5 in)
- Propellers: 3-bladed composite

Performance

- Maximum speed: 180 km/h (110 mph, 97 kn)
- Cruise speed: 120 km/h (75 mph, 65 kn)
- Rate of climb: 5.5 m/s (1,080 ft/min)
