= Vortech Skylark =

American homebuilt helicopter

Skylark

General information
- Type: Helicopter
- National origin: United States
- Manufacturer: Vortech
- Status: Plans available (2015)
- Number built: 5 (2005)

The Vortech Skylark is an American helicopter produced by Vortech of Fallston, Maryland. The aircraft is supplied in the form of plans for amateur construction. Vortech also supplies rotor blades for the design.

== Design and development ==
The Skylark was designed to comply with the US Experimental - Amateur-built aircraft rules. It features a single main rotor, a single-seat open cockpit without a windshield, skid-type landing gear and a twin cylinder, liquid-cooled, in-line two-stroke, carbureted 70 hp (52 kW) Hirth 3503 aircraft engine. The twin cylinder, liquid-cooled, in-line two-stroke, 64 hp (48 kW) Rotax 582 has also been used. A cockpit enclosure was optional.

The aircraft fuselage is made from welded 4130 steel tubing, with an aluminium tail boom. Its 19 ft (5.8 m) diameter two-bladed rotor employs a NACA 0012 airfoil. The main transmission is of belt and chain type, whileteh tail rotor is driven by a long shaft. The control system consists of conventional helicopters controls. The aircraft has an empty weight of 350 lb (159 kg) and a gross weight of 700 lb (318 kg), giving a useful load of 350 lb (159 kg). With full fuel of 8 U.S. gallons (30 L; 6.7 imp gal) the payload for pilot and baggage is 302 lb (137 kg).

The manufacturer estimates the construction time as 300 hours.

== Operational history ==
By 2005 the company reported that 5 were completed and flying.

By January 2015 no examples were registered in the United States with the Federal Aviation Administration, although one had been registered at one time.

The airframe plans have been spreading via internet under name "Furia".

== Specifications (Skylark) ==
Data from Kitplanes

General characteristics

- Crew: one
- Length: 17.5 ft (5.3 m)
- Airfoil: NACA 0012
- Empty weight: 350 lb (159 kg)
- Gross weight: 700 lb (318 kg)
- Fuel capacity: or 8 U.S. gallons (30 L; 6.7 imp gal)
- Powerplant: 1 × Hirth 3503 two cylinder, liquid-cooled, two stroke aircraft engine, 70 hp (52 kW)
- Main rotor diameter: 19 ft (5.8 m)
- Main rotor area: 283 sq ft (26.3 m^{2})

Performance

- Maximum speed: 95 mph (153 km/h, 83 kn)
- Cruise speed: 70 mph (110 km/h, 61 kn)
- Range: 120 mi (190 km, 100 nmi)
- Rate of climb: 1,000 ft/min (5.1 m/s)
- Disk loading: 2.5 lb/sq ft (12 kg/m^{2})

== See also ==
- List of rotorcraft
