= Rotortec Cloud Dancer I =

German gyroplane

Cloud Dancer I
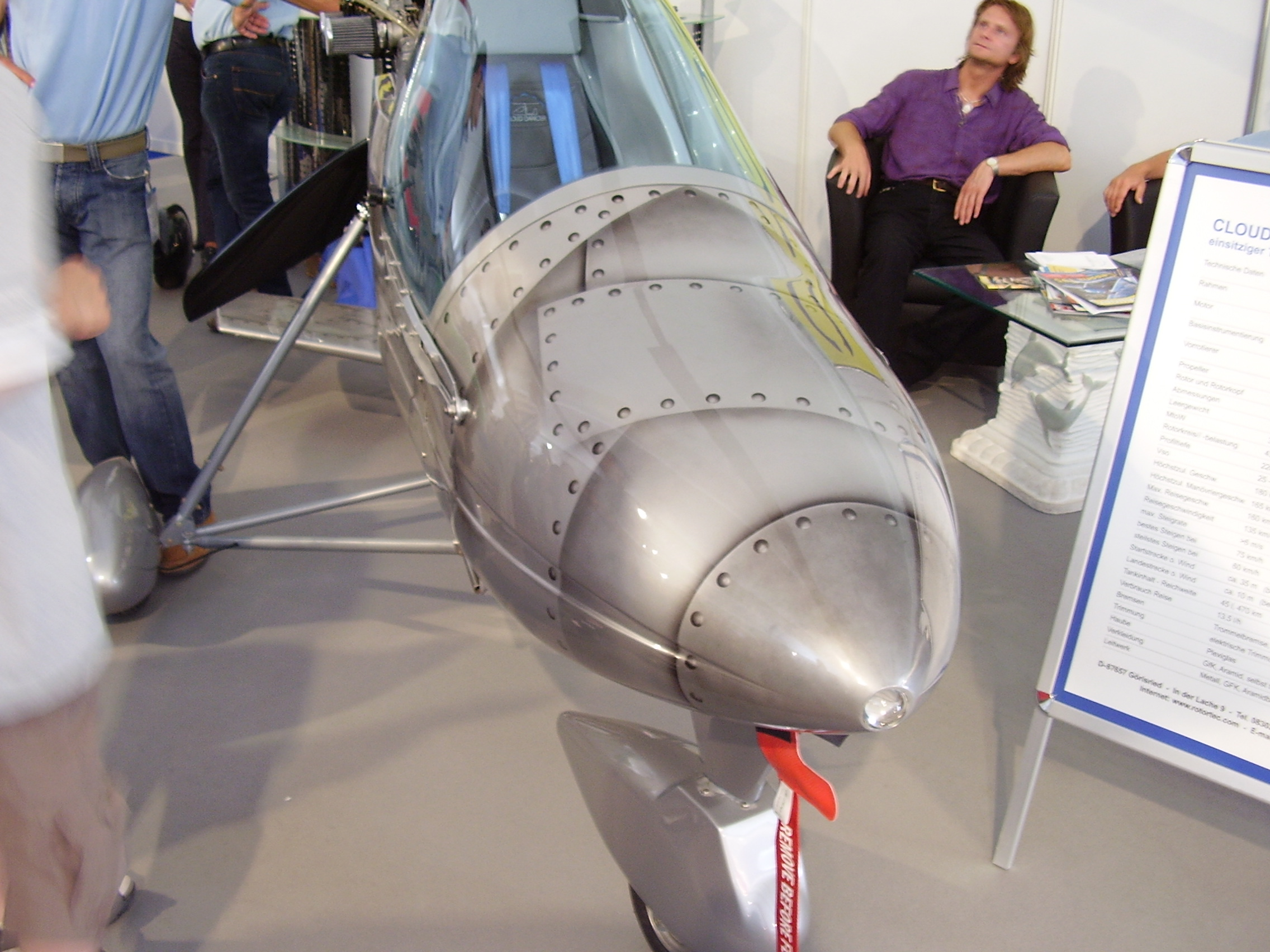
- Cloud Dancer I at ILA 2008

General information
- Type: Autogyro
- National origin: Germany
- Manufacturer: Rotortec
- Status: In production (2013)

The Rotortec Cloud Dancer I is a German autogyro, designed and produced by Rotortec of Görisried, Allgäu. The aircraft is supplied as a complete ready-to-fly-aircraft.

== Design and development ==
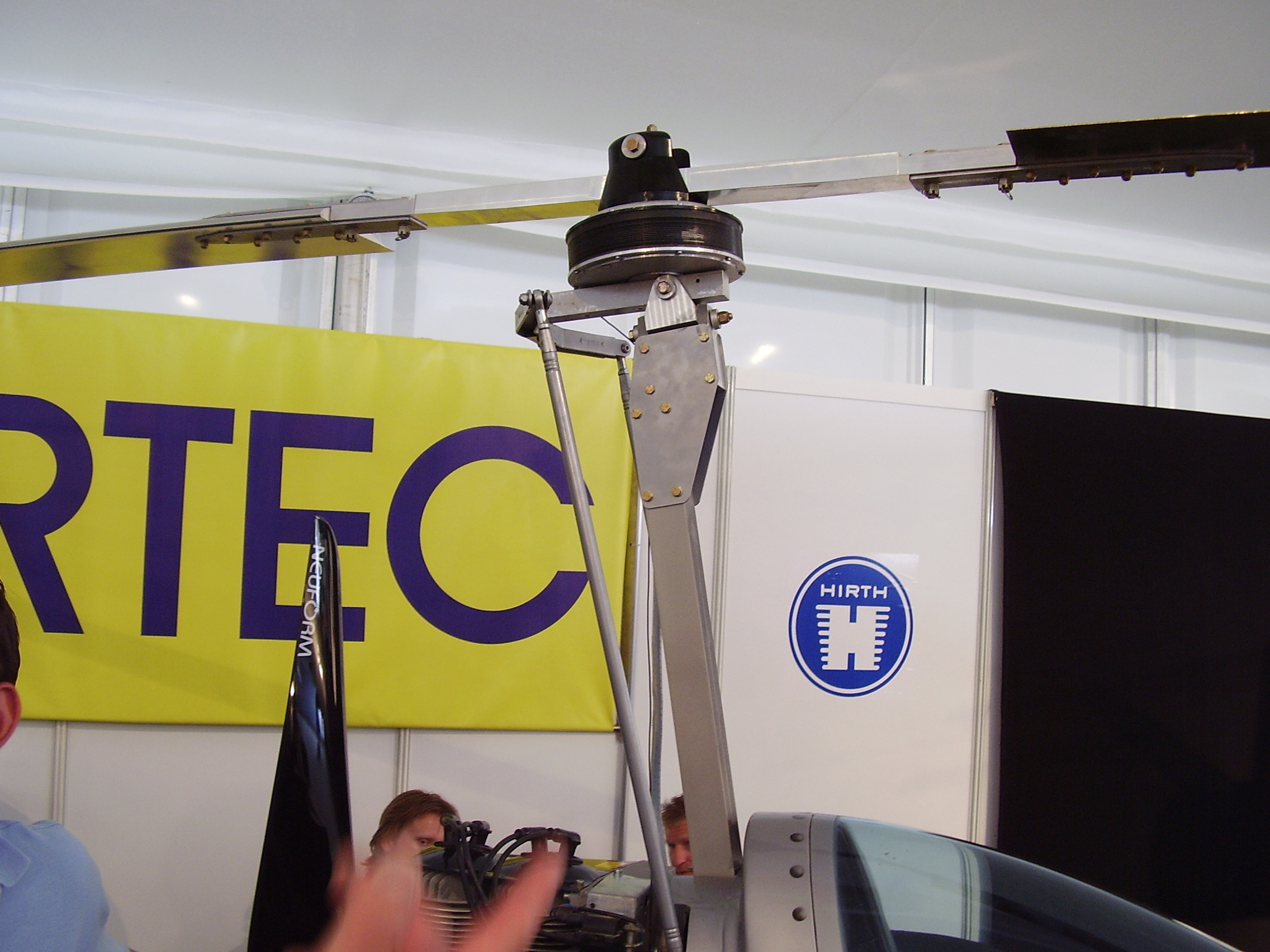
Cloud Dancer I rotor hub

The Cloud Dancer I features a single main rotor, a single-seat enclosed cockpit with a bubble canopy, tricycle landing gear with wheel pants and a twin cylinder, air-cooled 70 or 84 hp (52 or 63 kW) Hirth two stroke engine mounted in pusher configuration. The 65 hp (48 kW) twin-cylinder air-cooled in-line, two stroke, aircraft engine Hirth 3203 has also been employed.

The aircraft fuselage and tail are made from aluminum and Kevlar composites. Its 7.40 m (24.3 ft) diameter rotor has a chord of 17.5 cm (6.9 in) and is equipped with a pre-rotator with an electromagnetic clutch and Cardan drive. Electric trim and an electronic instrument panel are standard equipment. The aircraft has an empty weight of 170 kg (375 lb) and a gross weight of 300 kg (661 lb), giving a useful load of 130 kg (287 lb).

== Aircraft on display ==
- Hubschraubermuseum Bückeburg

== Specifications (Cloud Dancer I) ==
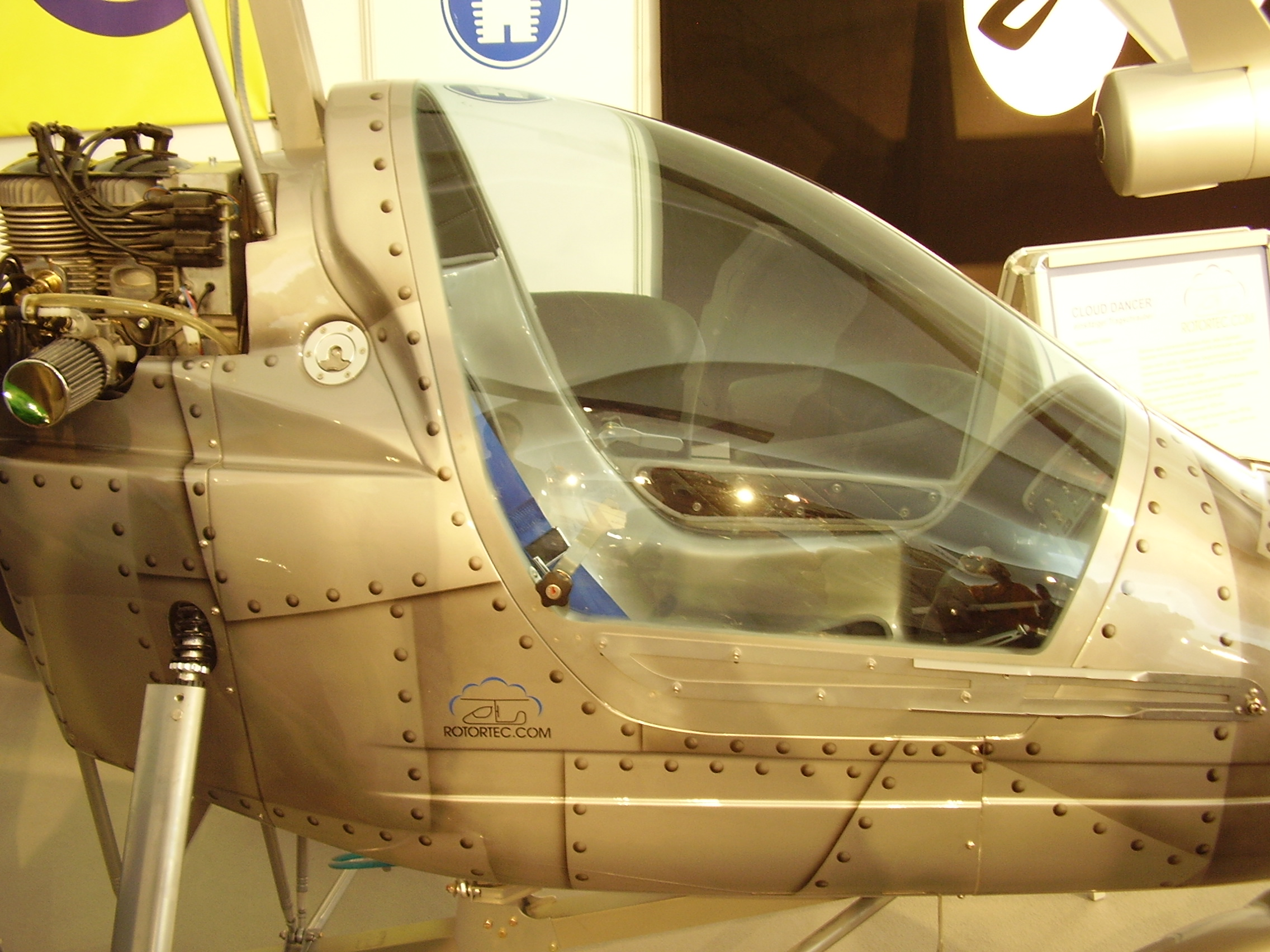
Cloud Dancer I at ILA 2008 with its composite Kevlar cockpit painted to resemble riveted metal.

Data from Bayerl

General characteristics

- Crew: one
- Empty weight: 170 kg (375 lb)
- Gross weight: 300 kg (661 lb)
- Fuel capacity: 45 litres (9.9 imp gal; 12 US gal)
- Powerplant: 1 × Hirth two stroke aircraft engine, 52 kW (70 hp)
- Main rotor diameter: 7.40 m (24 ft 3 in)
- Propellers: 3-bladed composite Helix-Carbon propeller

Performance

- Maximum speed: 160 km/h (99 mph, 86 kn)
- Cruise speed: 135 km/h (84 mph, 73 kn)
- Rate of climb: 5 m/s (980 ft/min)
