= Leonardo's aerial screw =

Archaic helicopter design

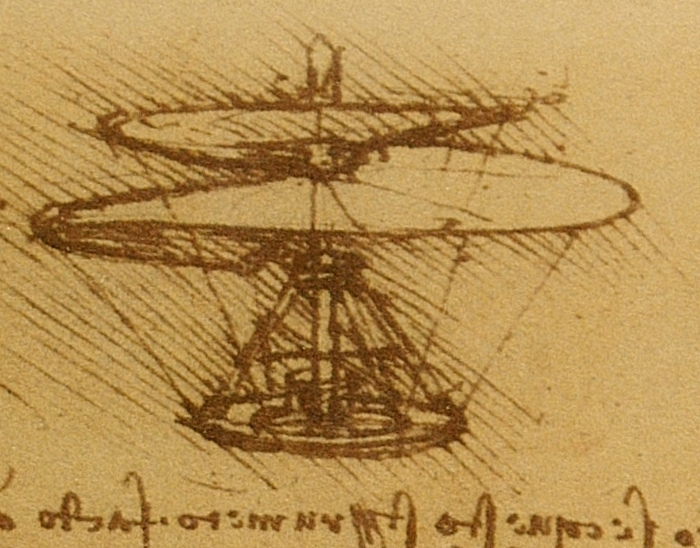
Detail of Leonardo's "aerial screw"

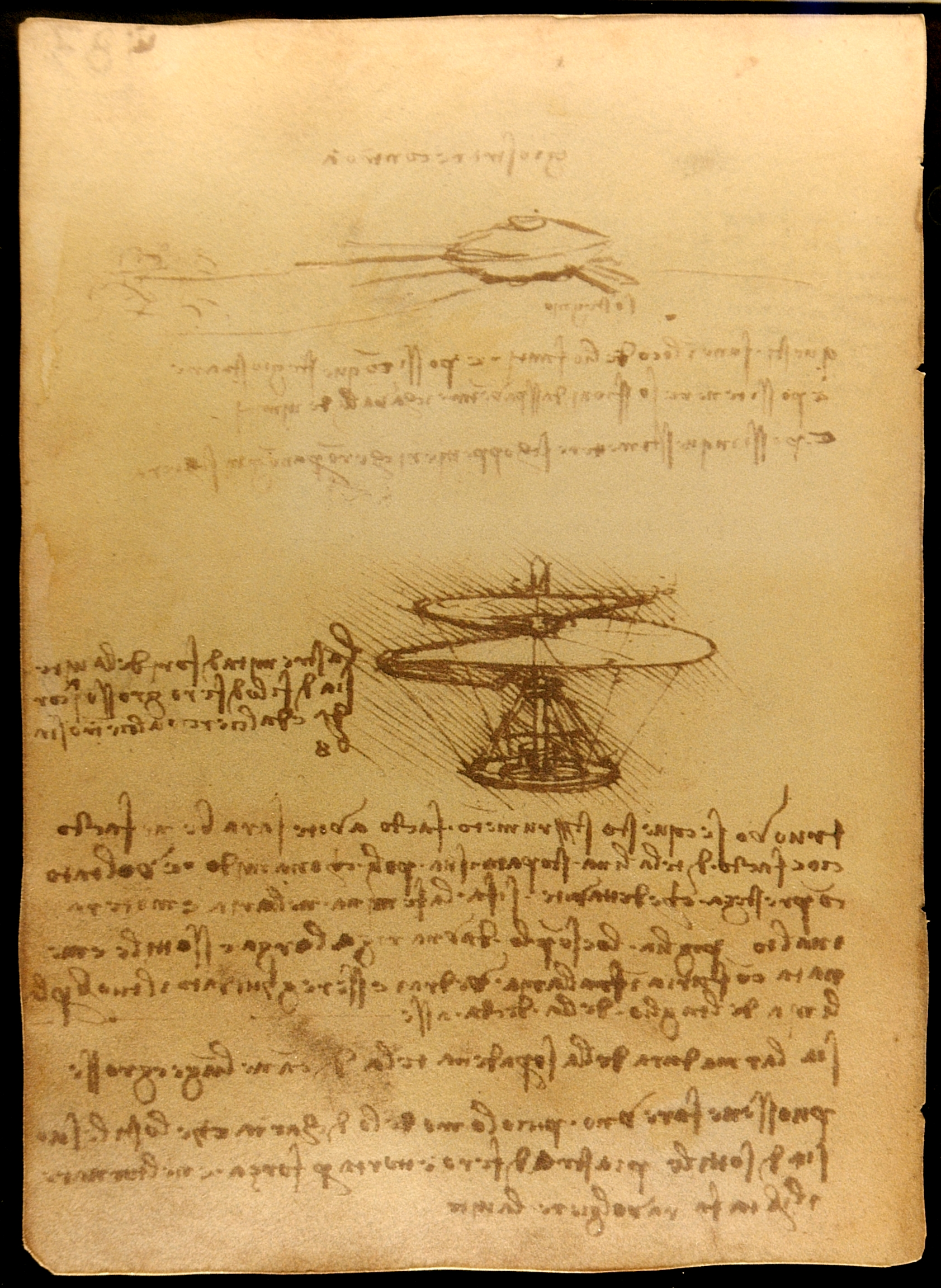
The page of Paris Manuscript B, folio 83v, that depicts Leonardo's aerial screw, held by the Institut de France

The Italian polymath Leonardo da Vinci drew his design for an "aerial screw" in the late 1480s, while he was employed as a military engineer by Ludovico Sforza, Duke of Milan from 1494 to 1499. The original drawing is part of a manuscript dated to 1487 to 1490 and appears on folio 83-verso of Paris Manuscript B, part of the papers removed from the Biblioteca Ambrosiana in 1795 by Napoleon and still held by the Institut de France in Paris.

Leonardo biographer Walter Isaacson has expressed the belief that it was "devised for a theatrical spectacle". The "aerial screw" was one of several aerial machines drawn by Leonardo, including an early parachute, an ornithopter and a hang glider.

The pen-and-ink sketch outlines an idea for a flying machine similar to a modern helicopter, with a spiral rotor or "aerial screw" based on a water screw, but intended to push against the fluid of the air instead of water.

The design comprises a large structure, built on a hard circular platform, with a central vertical pole supported by four diagonal members meeting at a small circular plate about halfway up the pole. The upper half of the pole is the supportive axis for a large spiralling sail of linen with a radius of about 5 m (16 ft), stiffened with starch. The inner edge of the sail winds clockwise around the pole, while the outer edge of the sail is connected by ropes or wires to a ring that rotates around the lower platform. The design envisions a crew of several people on the wooden platform running around the central pole while holding handles that rotate the sail.

Leonardo's annotations suggest that a linen aerial screw, if turned quickly enough, would push against the air and lift the structure into the air. The notes indicate that Leonardo built small flying models of the aerial screw, but there were no indications for any provision to stop the reaction against the rotation of the sail from making the craft itself rotate in the opposite direction. It is conceivable that Leonardo could have constructed small working models, but a full-size working version could not have been realised due to the lack of sufficiently light but strong materials, and a powerful enough drive for the screw.

Leonardo's designs were featured in the Italian Pavilion at World Expo 88, Brisbane Australia, including a model of the Aerial Screw. After the Expo it was donated to Griffith University, Brisbane where it has been displayed since 1988.

In 2022 a drone based on Leonardo's design was made by a team of engineers from University of Maryland and was presented at a conference in San Jose.

Modern models

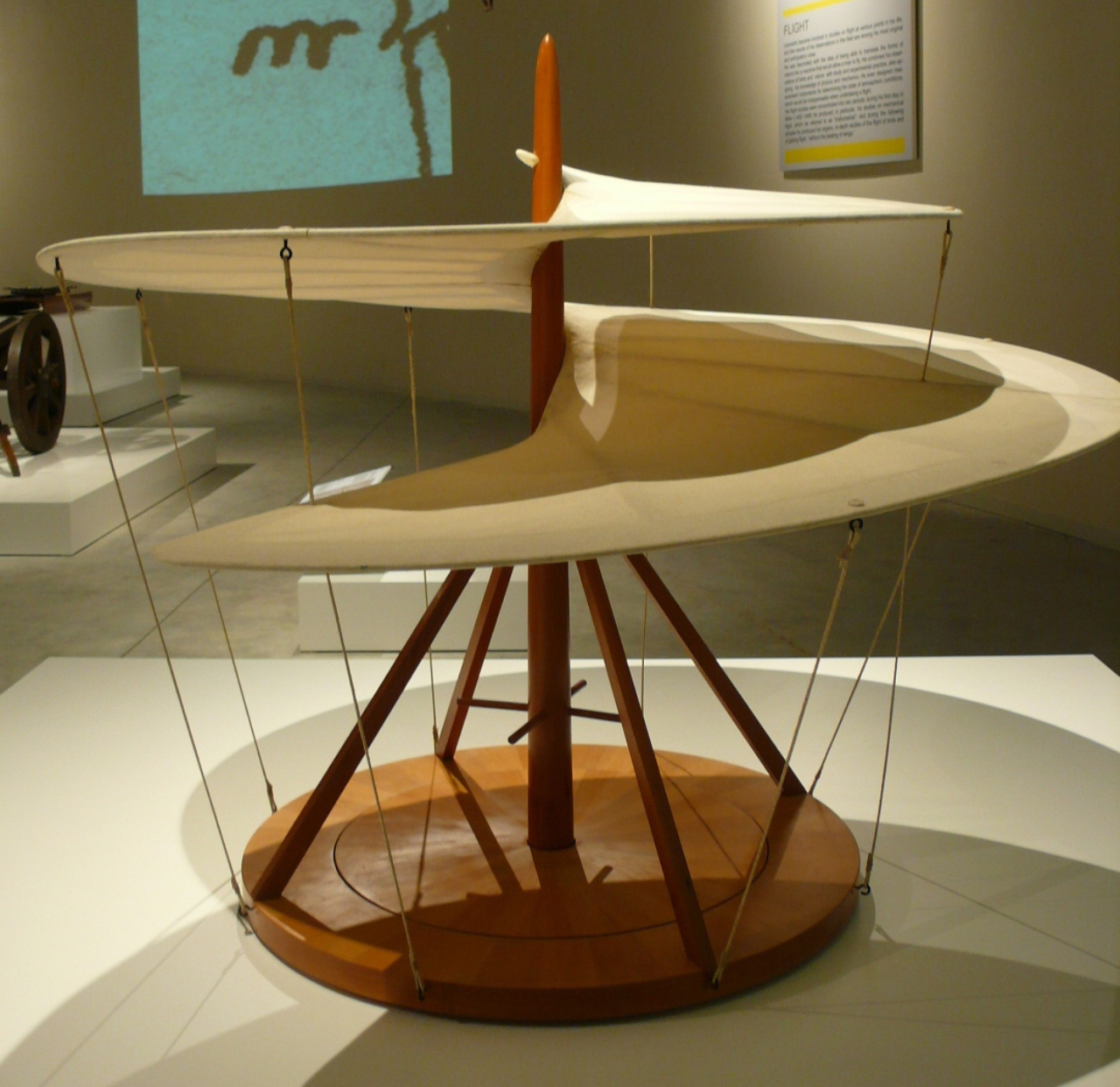
Model in the Museo Nazionale Scienza e Tecnologia Leonardo da Vinci, Milan

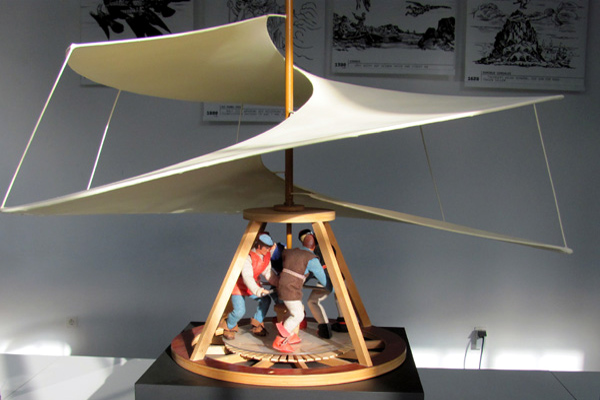
Model in the Hubschraubermuseum Bückeburg

== See also ==
- List of works by Leonardo da Vinci
