= Hirth 3502 =

German two-stroke aircraft engine

Hirth 3502 & 3503
- Type: Twin-cylinder two-stroke aircraft engine
- National origin: Germany
- Manufacturer: Hirth
- Manufactured: April 2008 – present (3502)

The Hirth 3502 and 3503 are a family of liquid-cooled, in-line twin-cylinder, two-stroke, carbureted aircraft engines, with optional fuel injection, designed for use on ultralight aircraft and small homebuilts. It is manufactured by Hirth of Germany.

== Development ==
The engines were developed as competitors to the 64 hp (48 kW) Rotax 582 with an identical mounting bolt pattern to the 582, allowing either to be a drop-in replacement. The engines are similar to the Rotax powerplant in being liquid-cooled, two-cylinder in-line engines, with dual capacitor discharge ignition. The 3502 was developed from the 3503 as a de-rated version and produces 60 hp (45 kW), in comparison to the 3503's 70 hp (52 kW). Both engines have the same bore, stroke and compression ratio as the three-cylinder in-line liquid-cooled Hirth 3701 and the bore, stroke, compression ratio and displacement of the twin-cylinder Hirth 2704 and Hirth 2706.

Both the 3502 and 3503 are equipped with dual Bing 34 mm slide carburetors or optionally electronic fuel injection. The cylinder walls are electrochemically coated with Nikasil and the crankshaft is forged from 4130 steel. Standard starting is recoil start with electric start as an option. The reduction drive system available is the G-50 gearbox, with reduction ratios of 2.16:1, 2.29:1, 2.59:1, 3.16:1, or 3.65:1.

The engines run on a 50:1 pre-mix of unleaded 93 octane auto fuel and oil, or optionally oil injection.

== Variants ==
3502
Twin-cylinder in-line, liquid-cooled, two-stroke aircraft engine with dual Bing 34 mm slide carburetors or fuel injection. Produces 60 hp (45 kW) at 5000 rpm and has a factory rated TBO of 1200 hours. In production since April 2008.
3503
Twin-cylinder in-line, liquid-cooled, two-stroke aircraft engine with dual Bing 34 mm slide carburetors or fuel injection. Produces 70 hp (52 kW) at 6500 rpm and has a factory rated TBO of 1000 hours. In production.

== Applications ==
3502

- CGS Hawk Arrow II
- Fresh Breeze XCitor - powered parachute
- Paraski - powered parachute

3503

- Excalibur Aircraft Excalibur
- GyroTec DF02
- Rotortec Cloud Dancer Light
- Summit Steel Breeze - powered parachute
- Vortech Skylark - helicopter

== Specifications (3503) ==
Data from Recreational Power Engineering

=== General characteristics ===
- Type: Twin-cylinder, two-stroke, in-line, aircraft engine
- Bore: 76 mm (3.0 in)
- Stroke: 69 mm (2.7 in)
- Displacement: 625 cc (38.1 cu in)
- Length: 398 mm (15.7 in)
- Width: 368 mm (14.5 in)
- Height: 419 mm (16.5 in)
- Dry weight: 79 lb (35.8 kg) without radiator & coolant. The G-50 gearbox adds an additional 19 lb (8.6 kg)

=== Components ===
- Fuel system: 2 X Bing 34 mm slide type carburetors or fuel injection
- Fuel type: unleaded 93 octane auto fuel
- Oil system: 50:1 fuel/oil premix or oil injection
- Cooling system: liquid
- Reduction gear: G-50 gearbox with reduction ratios of 2.16:1, 2.29:1, 2.59:1, 3.16:1, or 3.65:1 or cog-belt

=== Performance ===
- Power output: 70 hp (52 kW) at 6500 rpm
- Compression ratio: 9.5:1
