= Görisried =

- Municipality
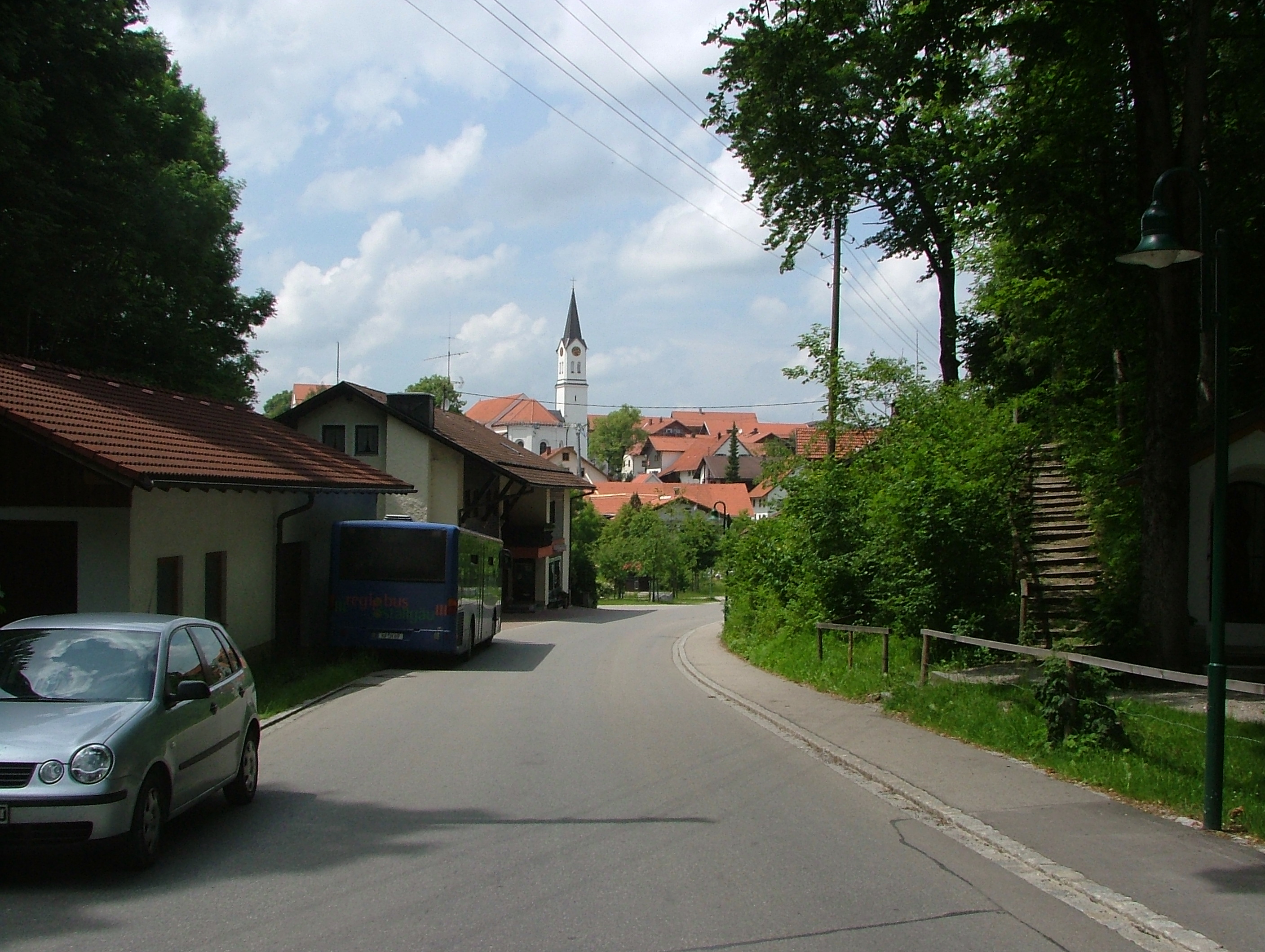
- View towards the center of Görisried

- Coat of arms

- Location of Görisried within Ostallgäu district
- Interactive map of Görisried
- Location within Germany Location within Bavaria
- Coordinates: 47°42′N 10°30′E
- Country: Germany
- State: Bavaria
- Admin. region: Schwaben
- District: Ostallgäu
- Municipal assoc.: Unterthingau

Government
  - Mayor (2020–26): Stephan Bea

Area
  - Total: 23.14 km^{2} (8.93 sq mi)
- Elevation: 769–940 m (2,523–3,084 ft)

Population (2025-12-31)
  - Total: 1,343
  - Density: 58.04/km^{2} (150.3/sq mi)
- Time zone: UTC+01:00 (CET)
  - Summer (DST): UTC+02:00 (CEST)
- Postal codes: 87657
- Dialling codes: 08302
- Vehicle registration: OAL
- Website: www.goerisried.de

Görisried (German pronunciation: [ˈɡøːʁɪsʁiːt]) is a municipality in the district of Ostallgäu in Bavaria in Germany.
