= FWK =

FWK or fwk may refer to:

- FWK, ICAO airline code for American airline Flightworks
- FWK, block code for the Buer heating power station, part of the Scholven Power Station
- FWK Westerholt, district heating plant at Westerholt Power Station
- Freie Wähler Kempen (Free Voters Kempen), political party in Kempen, Germany
- fwk, code used in Aquiles Apache Cassandra client
