= List of airline codes (F) =

This is a list of all airline codes. The table lists the IATA airline designators, the ICAO airline designators and the airline call signs (telephony designator). Historical assignments are also included for completeness.

== Codes ==
Airline codes
IATA	ICAO	Airline	Call sign	Country	Comments
	FRX	Fort Aero	FORT AERO	Estonia	
	PBR	Fast Air	POLAR BEAR	Canada	
	SRE	Fly Jetstream Aviation	STREAMJET	South Africa	
	FTZ	Fastjet	GREY BIRD	Tanzania	
	FAP	F Air	FAIR SCHOOL	Czech Republic	
	FFL	ForeFlight	FOREFLIGHT	United States	3rd party Privacy ICAO Address (PIA) callsign used to obscure true airplane registrations
	EYE	F.S. Air Service	SOCKEYE	United States	
	IFA	FAI Air Service	RED ANGEL	Germany	
	FLC	FINFO Flight Inspection Aircraft	FLIGHT CHECK	United States	
	FKI	FLM Aviation Mohrdieck	KIEL AIR	Germany	
	DCM	FLTPLAN (anonymized service)	DOT COM	United States	3rd party Privacy ICAO Address (PIA) callsign used to obscure true airplane registrations
	FLW	FLowair Aviation	QUICKFLOW	France	
	FMG	FMG Verkehrsfliegerschule Flughafen Paderborn-Lippstadt	HUSKY	Germany	
	FRA	FR Aviation	RUSHTON	United Kingdom	
	FSB	FSB Flugservice & Development	SEABIRD	Germany	
	LEJ	FSH Luftfahrtunternehmen	LEIPZIG FAIR	Germany	
	FBA	Fab Air	FAB AIR	Kyrgyzstan	
	FCS	Facts Air	MEXFACTS	Mexico	
	FAV	Fair Aviation	FAIRAVIA	South Africa	
	FWD	Fair Wind Air Charter	FAIR WIND	United Arab Emirates	
	FLS	Fairlines	FAIRLINE	Netherlands	Defunct
	FFC	Fairoaks Flight Centre	FAIROAKS	United Kingdom	
	FWY	Fairways Corporation	FAIRWAYS	United States	
	FCN	Falcon Air	FALCON	Sweden	
	FAR	Falcon Air	FALCAIR	Slovenia	
	FAO	Falcon Air Express	PANTHER	United States	
	FAU	Falcon Airline	FALCON AIRLINE	Nigeria	
	FBU	French Bee	FRENCH BEE	France	
IH		Falcon Aviation		Sweden	
	FVS	Falcon Aviation Services	FALCON AVIATION	United Arab Emirates	
	FJC	Falcon Jet Centre	FALCONJET	United Kingdom	
	FAW	Falwell Aviation	FALWELL	United States	
FE	FEA	Far Eastern Air Transport	Far Eastern	Taiwan	
FD		Royal Flying Doctor Service	FLYDOC	Australia	
	FDL	Farmingdale State University	FARMINGDALE STATE	United States	
	FAH	Farnair Hungary	BLUE STRIP	Hungary	
	FRN	Farnair Netherlands	FARNED	Netherlands	Defunct, ICAO code in use by another company
	FAT	ASL Airlines Switzerland	FARNER	Switzerland	Previously: Farnair Switzerland
	RAF	Farnas Aviation Services	FARNAS	Sudan	
	HBL	Faroecopter	HELIBLUE	Denmark	
F6	RCK	FaroeJet	ROCKROSE	Faroe Islands	
	FRW	Farwest Airlines	FARWEST	United States	
F3	FSW	Faso Airways	FASO	Burkina Faso	
	FHL	Fast Helicopters	FINDON	United Kingdom	
	FAY	Fayban Air Services	FAYBAN AIR	Nigeria	
	SKM	Fayetteville Flying Service and Scheduled Skyways System	SKYTEM	United States	
	FDR	Federal Air	FEDAIR	South Africa	
	FLL	Federal Airlines	FEDERAL AIRLINES	Sweden	
	DCN	Federal Armed Forces	DIPLOMATIC CLEARANCE	Germany	
	FRM	Federal Armored Service	FEDARM	United States	
	NHK	Federal Aviation Administration	NIGHTHAWK	United States	
FX	FDX	FedEx Express	FEDEX	United States	
	FNK	Feniks Airline	AURIKA	Kazakhstan	
	FER	Feria Aviación	FERIA	Spain	
N8	HGK	Fika Salaama Airlines	SALAAMA	Uganda	
4S	FNC	Finalair Congo	FINALAIR CONGO	Republic of the Congo	
	FAK	Financial Airxpress	FACTS	United States	
	FBF	Fine Airlines	FINE AIR	United States	
	FTR	Finist'air	FINISTAIR	France	
AY	FIN	Finnair	FINNAIR	Finland	
FC	WBA	Finncomm Airlines	WESTBIRD	Finland	
	FNF	Finnish Air Force	FINNFORCE	Finland	
	FIH	FinnHEMS	FINNHEMS	Finland	
FY	FFM	Firefly	FIREFLY	Malaysia	
7F	FAB	First Air	FIRST AIR	Canada	
	JRF	First Air Transport		Japan	
	FCC	First Cambodia Airlines	FIRST CAMBODIA	Cambodia	
	FCA	Fly-Coop Air Service	COOPAIR	Hungary	
	MBL	First City Air	FIRST CITY	United Kingdom	
	GGA	First Flying Squadron	JAWJA	United States	
	FIR	First Line Air	FIRSTLINE AIR	Sierra Leone	
	FTS	First Sabre	FIRST SABRE	Mexico	
8F	FFR	Fischer Air	FISCHER	Czech Republic	
	FFP	Fischer Air Polska	FLYING FISH	Poland	
8D	EXV	FitsAir	EXPOAVIA	Sri Lanka	
	FSX	Flagship Express Services	FLAG	United States	
F8	FLE	Flair Airlines	FLAIR	Canada	
	WAF	Flamenco Airways	FLAMENCO	United States	
	FMR	Flamingo Air	FLAMINGO AIR	United States	
	FLN	Flamingo Air-Line	ILIAS	Kazakhstan	
	FSH	Flash Airlines	FLASH	Egypt	
	BWY	Fleet Requirements Air Direction Unit	BROADWAY	United Kingdom	
	FLR	Fleetair	FLEETAIR	South Africa	
	FXY	Flexair	FLEXY	Netherlands	Defunct
	FXT	Flexflight		Denmark	
	TUD	Flight Alaska	TUNDRA	United States	
	FCK	FCS Flight Calibration Services	NAV CHECKER	Germany	
	VOR	Flight Calibration Services Ltd.	FLIGHT CAL	United Kingdom	
	FCV	Flight Centre Victoria	NAVAIR	Canada	
	FCP	Nelson Aviation College Ltd	FLIGHTCORP	New Zealand	Nelson Aviation College
	FDP	Flight Dispatch Services		Poland	
	FLX	Flight Express, Inc.	FLIGHT EXPRESS	United States	
	CFI	Flight Inspection Center of the General Administration of Civil Aviation in China	CHINA JET	China	
	LTS	Flight Inspections and Systems	SPECAIR	Russia	
	IVJ	Flight International	INVADER JACK	United States	
	MIT	Flight Line	MATCO	United States	
	FOI	Flight Ops International		United States	
	OPT	Flight Options	OPTIONS	United States	
	CLB	Flight Precision Limited	CALIBRATOR	United Kingdom	
	FSL	Flight Safety Limited	FLIGHTSAFETY	United Kingdom	
	FSU	Flight Support Sweden		Sweden	
	CCK	Flight Trac	CABLE CHECK	United States	
	AYR	Flight Training Europe	CYGNET	Spain	
	FWQ	Flight West	UNITY	Australia	
	KLO	Flight-Ops International	KLONDIKE	Canada	
	CSK	Flightcraft	CASCADE	United States	
	FEX	Flightexec	FLIGHTEXEC	Canada	
B5	FLT	Flightline	FLIGHTLINE	United Kingdom	defunct
	FTL	Flightline	FLIGHT-AVIA	Spain	
	FPS	Flightpass Limited	FLIGHTPASS	United Kingdom	
	FSR	Flightstar Corporation	FLIGHTSTAR	United States	
	KDZ	Flightworks	KUDZU	United States	Avior Technologies Operations
	FAZ	Flint Aviation Services	FLINT AIR	United States	
	KWX	Florida Aerocharter	KAY DUB	United States	Allocated in 2014
	OJY	Florida Air	OHJAY	United States	
	FAS	Florida Air Cargo	FLORIDA CARGO	United States	Allocated in 2014
PA	FCL	Florida Coastal Airlines	FLORIDA COASTAL	United States	
	FFS	Florida Department of Agriculture	FORESTRY	United States	
	TCF	Florida Institute of Technology	TECH FLIGHT	United States	
	FJS	Florida Jet Service	FLORIDAJET	United States	
RF	FWL	Florida West International Airways	FLO WEST	United States	Merged into Atlas Air Worldwide Holdings. Defunct as of 28 February 2017, IATA code now allocated to another user
	FFG	Flugdienst Fehlhaber	WITCHCRAFT	Germany	
	FLU	Flugschule Basel	YELLOW FLYER	Switzerland	
	EZB	Flugschule Eichenberger	EICHENBURGER	Switzerland	
	FWZ	Flugwerkzeuge Aviation Software		Austria	
	VNX	Fly Advance	VANCE	United States	Allocated in 2014
F2	FLM	Fly Air	FLY WORLD	Turkey	
8W	EDR	Fly All Ways	BIRDVIEW	Suriname	
G6	ACY	Fly Arna	ARNA	Armenia	
	FCT	Fly CI Limited	DEALER	United Kingdom	
	FEE	Fly Europa Limited	FLY EURO	United Kingdom	
	FXL	Fly Excellent	FLY EXCELLENT	Sweden	
9Y	FGE	Fly Georgia	GEORGIA WING	Georgia	
	NVJ	Fly International Airways	NOUVINTER	Tunisia	
OJ	FJM	Fly Jamaica Airways	GREENHEART	Jamaica	defunct
9P	FJL	Fly Jinnah	Okaab	Pakistan	
	FIL	Fly Line	FLYLINE	Spain	
SH	FLY	Fly Me Sweden	FLYBIRD	Sweden	
FP	PVV	Fly Pro	Sunday	Moldova	
	FRB	Fly Rak	RAKWAY	United Arab Emirates	
6P	IAD	Fly Wex	FLYWEX	Italy	
F6	VAW	Fly2Sky	SOFIA JET	Bulgaria	
	FYA	Flyant	FLYANT	Spain	
D7	XFA	FlyAsianXpress	FAX AIR	Malaysia	
F7	BBO	Flybaboo	BABOO	Switzerland	
BE	BEE	Flybe	JERSEY	United Kingdom	Formerly Jersey European Airways
FO	FBZ	Flybondi	BONDI	Argentina	
	FCE	Flycolumbia	FLYCOLUMBIA	Spain	
FT	FEG	FlyEgypt	SKY EGYPT	Egypt	
	GVG	Flygaktiebolaget Gota Vingar	BLUECRAFT	Sweden	
Y2	GSM	Flyglobespan	GLOBESPAN	United Kingdom	defunct
	FPA	Flygprestanda		Sweden	
SX	TOR	FlyGTA Airlines	HOMERUN	Canada	
	ETS	Flygtransporter I Nykoping	EXTRANS	Sweden	
	INU	Flyguppdraget Backamo	INSTRUCTOR	Sweden	
W3	FYH	Flyhy Cargo Airlines	FLY HIGH	Thailand	
	FCR	Flying Carpet Company	FLYING CARPET	Lebanon	
	FYG	Flying Service	FLYING GROUP	Belgium	
	FGP	Flying-Research Aerogeophysical Center	FLYING CENTER	Russia	
TE	LIL	FlyLal	LITHUANIA AIR	Lithuania	defunct
	FLK	Flylink Express	FLYLINK	Spain	
XY	KNE	Flynas	NAS EXPRESS	Saudi Arabia	
LF	NDC	FlyNordic	NORDIC	Sweden	defunct
FP	FRE	FlyPelican	PELICAN	Australia	Pelican Airlines Pty Ltd since 1 June 2015
FS	FOX	Flyr	GREENSTAR	Norway	
	FTM	Flyteam Aviation	FLYTEAM	United Kingdom	
VK	FVK	FlyViking	BALDER	Norway	defunct
	FMI	FMI Air	FIRST MYANMAR	Myanmar	
	FKS	Focus Air	FOCUS	United States	Omega Air Holdings
	FOP	Fokker		Netherlands	Flight Operations
	NOF	Fonnafly	FONNA	Norway	
	FOB	Ford Motor Company	FORDAIR	United Kingdom	
VY	FOS	Formosa Airlines		Taiwan	defunct
	FOR	Formula One Management	FORMULA	United Kingdom	
	FHS	Forth and Clyde Helicopter Services	HELISCOT	United Kingdom	
	FXC	Fortunair Canada	AIR FUTURE	Canada	
BN		Forward Air International Airlines		United States	
	FSA	Foster Aviation	FOSTER-AIR	United States	
	JFY	Foster Yeoman	YEOMAN	United Kingdom	
	FTE	Fotografia F3	FOTOGRAFIA	Spain	
5F	FIA	FlyOne	FIA	Moldova	Allocated in 2016
3F	FIE	FlyOne Armenia	ARMRIDER	Armenia	
HK	FSC	Four Star Aviation / Four Star Cargo	FOUR STAR	United States	Virgin Islands
	WDS	Four Winds Aviation	WINDS	United States	
	FXR	Foxair	WILDFOX	Italy	
	FDO	France Douanes	FRENCH CUSTOM	France	
FH	FHY	Freebird Airlines	FREEBIRD AIR	Turkey	
SJ	FOM	Freedom Air	FREE AIR	New Zealand	defunct
FP	FRE	Freedom Air	FREEDOM	United States	Aviation Services
	FFF	Freedom Air Services	INTER FREEDOM	Nigeria	
	FRL	Freedom Airlines	FREEDOM AIR	United States	ICAO Code and callsign withdrawn
	FAS	Freedom Airways	FREEDOM AIRWAYS	Cyprus	
	FWC	Freeway Air	FREEWAY	Netherlands	Defunct
	FRG	Freight Runners Express	FREIGHT RUNNERS	United States	
	FAF	Force Aerienne Francaise	FRENCH AIR FORCE	France	
	FMY	Aviation Legere De L'Armee De Terre	FRENCH ARMY	France	
	FNY	France Marine Nationale	FRENCH NAVY	France	
	FRR	Fresh Air	FRESH AIR	Nigeria	
	BZY	Fresh Air Aviation	BREEZY	United States	2015
	FAE	Freshaer	WILDGOOSE	United Kingdom	
	FAL	Friendship Air Alaska	FRIENDSHIP	United States	
	FLF	Friendship Airlines	FRIEND AIR	Uganda	
	FGY	Froggy Corporate Aviation		Australia	
F9	FFT	Frontier Airlines	FRONTIER FLIGHT	United States	
	ITR	Frontier Commuter	OUT BACK	United States	
2F	FTA	Frontier Flying Service	FRONTIER-AIR	United States	
	FNG	Frontier Guard	FINNGUARD	Finland	
	FUJ	Fujairah Aviation Centre	FUJAIRAH	United Arab Emirates	
	CFJ	Fujian Airlines	FUJIAN	China	
	GAX	Full Express	GRAND AIRE	United States	
	FAM	Fumigación Aérea Andaluza	FAASA	Spain	
	FFY	Fun Flying Thai Air Service	FUN FLYING	Thailand	
	ROG	FundaciÃ³ Rego	REGO	Spain	
	FUN	Funtshi Aviation Service	FUNTSHI	Democratic Republic of the Congo	
	FGL	Futura Gael	Applewood	Ireland	defunct
FH	FUA	Futura International Airways	FUTURA	Spain	defunct
FZ	FDB	Flydubai	SKYDUBAI	UAE	
	FWK	Flightworks		United States	
	ACT	Flight Line	AMERICAN CHECK	United States	
	FRF	Fleet Air International	FAIRFLEET	Hungary	
	FUM	Fuxion Line Mexico	FUNLINE	Mexico	
	FWR	FlightAware	FLIGHT AWARE	United States	3rd party Privacy ICAO Address (PIA) callsign used to obscure true airplane registrations

== IATA Traffic Conference Areas ==
The International Air Transport Association (IATA) divides the world into three areas called the Traffic Conference Areas (TCAs) for air travel purposes. These areas are used to define geographical boundaries for fare construction and other industry-related practices:

- Traffic Conference Area 1 (TC1) – this area includes the Americas, encompassing North America (the Caribbean, Central America, and Northern America) and South America.
- Traffic Conference Area 2 (TC2) – this area includes the EMEA region, encompassing Europe, the Middle East, and Africa (North Africa and Sub-Saharan Africa).
- Traffic Conference Area 3 (TC3) – this area includes the Asia–Pacific region, encompassing the rest of Asia (Central Asia, East Asia, North Asia, South Asia, and Southeast Asia) and Oceania.

Essentially, TC1 covers the "New World", while TC2 and TC3 together cover the "Old World" (Africa-Eurasia) and the "Land Down Under".

== See also ==
- IATA airport code
- ICAO airport code
