= PADC Defiant =

Defiant

General information
- Type: Trainer and light attack aircraft
- National origin: Philippines
- Manufacturer: Philippine Aerospace Development Corporation
- Designer: Gold Wings Aviation
- Built by: Gold Wings Aviation
- Status: Cancelled
- Primary user: Philippine Air Force
- Number built: 1 complete and 1 incomplete prototype

History
- First flight: 22 February 1988

The PADC Defiant was a trainer and light attack aircraft formerly developed by the Philippine Aerospace Development Corporation to reduce dependence on second-hand aircraft for the Philippine Air Force.

== Development ==
In 1981, Gold Wings Aviation conceived an aircraft research and development undertaking called the Norlindo program, named after one of its first engineers. The program covered a progressive development of a high-performance trainer primarily intended for use by the PAF. The program was launched as an innovative step to build an aircraft of local design and utilizing indigenous materials. Gold Wings initiated preliminary design of a twin-engine turboprop named Norlindo and even began conceptual design of a turbojet trainer called Tinihaban Superstrike under the All-Filipino Technology Aircraft (AFTA) project. Out of these experiences, a single, piston engine trainer aircraft was conceived, designed, built and flown within three years.

The Defiant 300 prototype flew twice, the first in February 1987. The Defiant project came out to be an excellent collaborative effort of a group of aeronautical engineers, aviation enthusiasts, government agencies and research institutions. The Ramos administration in 1997 renamed the Defiant project to Centennial and was given green light alongside the PADC Hummingbird helicopters.

Based on the successful flights of the prototype, Gold Wings planned to build another prototype of a modified Defiant (appropriately named Defiant 500) with an all-metal airframe and power rating increased to 500 hp. Due to lack of financial support from the government, the plan did not push through, including another design of a light aircraft called Pegasus, which was presented to the Philippine Army as a contender for the proposed Philippine Army aviation arm.

== Design ==
The two-seat tandem Defiant prototype (registered as RP-X239) was an exceptional technical arrangement of various systems and parts taken from different types of aircraft in the PAF inventory. The landing gears, flight controls and flaps motor were taken from the Beechcraft T-34 Mentor, seats from the Cessna U-17B, rudder and brake pedals from the Boeing-Stearman PT-13 and various instrument items from the Britten-Norman BN-2 Islander, T-34 Mentor, Sikorsky S-76 and SIAI-Marchetti SF.260. The Defiant was powered by a single Lycoming IO-540-K1B5 piston engine on loan from the PADC, the same engine that powers the BN-2 Islander. The prototype had the highest engine power rating of all the prototypes of local design flown so far.

Noteworthy were several original features designed and fabricated by the engines with technical support from several persons and companies. The airframe was fabricated from wood and fiberglass with a Lycoming engine. The engine mount was fabricated from chrome molybdenum steel. Most significant of all was the fabrication and assembly of a one-piece plastic canopy. Fuel tanks were constructed with 5052-H34 aluminum alloys. Instrument panel, electrical, hydraulic and pitot-static systems were laid out with the help of reference books and articles.

== Variants ==
Defiant 300
The first prototype, powered by a single Lycoming IO-540-K1B5 piston engine, which had its maiden flight on February 22, 1988.
Defiant 500
The second prototype, with an all-metal airframe and a 500 hp engine, was not finished due to lack of financial support from the government.

== Aircraft on display ==
- The Defiant 300 is currently on display in a hangar at the Philippine State College of Aeronautics.

== Specifications (Defiant 300) ==
Data from Jane's All The World's Aircraft 1990–91

General characteristics

- Crew: Two
- Length: 8.51 m (27 ft 11 in)
- Wingspan: 9.52 m (31 ft 3 in)
- Height: 3.73 m (12 ft 3 in)
- Wing area: 12.55 m^{2} (135.1 sq ft)
- Airfoil: NACA 2418 (root), NACA 2412 (tip)
- Empty weight: 1,278 kg (2,818 lb)
- Max takeoff weight: 1,583 kg (3,490 lb)
- Powerplant: 1 × Textron Lycoming IO-540-K1B5 air-cooled flat-six engine, 224 kW (300 hp)

Performance

- Maximum speed: 357 km/h (222 mph, 193 kn)
- Stall speed: 110 km/h (68 mph, 59 kn) (flaps down)
- Range: 1,896 km (1,178 mi, 1,024 nmi)
- Service ceiling: 7,520 m (24,670 ft)
- Rate of climb: 7.8 m/s (1,540 ft/min)

== See also ==
- PADC Hummingbird

Related lists

- List of aircraft (P)
