= FGY =

FGY may refer to:

- FGY, ICAO airline code for Australian airline Froggy Corporate Aviation
- FGY, division code for Fogang County, Guangdong, China
- FGY, shortening of Frankfurt Galaxy, a professional American football team in Frankfurt, Germany
- FGY, code for the Ligny railway station, a railway station in Belgium
