= FYG =

FYG may refer to:

- Find Your Grind, education platform founded by American entrepreneur Nick Gross
- For Your Guidance, an email subject abbreviation
- FYG, abbreviation used to refer to Hong Kong Federation of Youth Groups, a youth organisation in Hong Kong
- FYG, ICAO airline code for Flying Service, a Belgian airline
- FYG, FAA airport code for Washington Regional Airport, an airport in Missouri
- FYG, division code for Fengyang County, Anhui, China
- FYG, IATA code for Fuyong Ferry Terminal, Shenzhen, China
- FYG, 2020 single in Keke Palmer discography
