= MBB Bo 105 =

Helicopter made by Bölkow

Bo 105
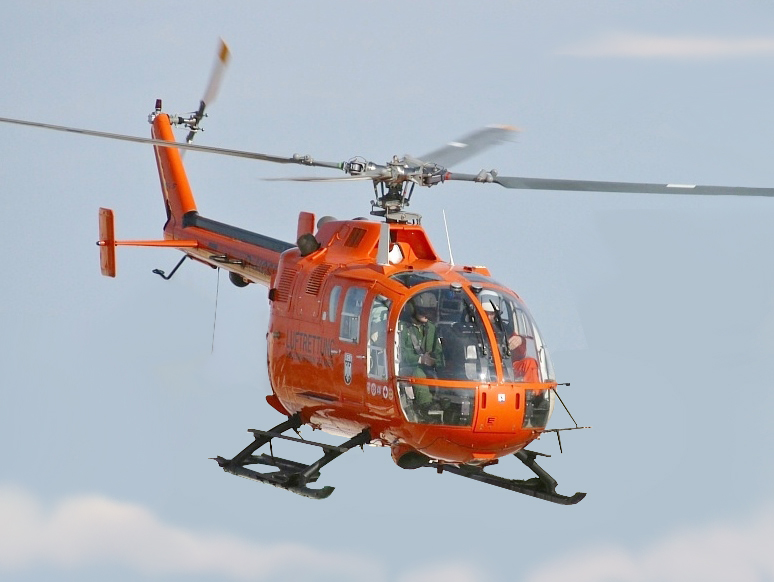
- A Bo 105 flying with Luftrettung Bundesministerium des Innern

General information
- Type: Light utility helicopter
- National origin: West Germany
- Manufacturer: Messerschmitt-Bölkow-Blohm (MBB)
- Status: In service
- Primary users: Republic of Korea Army Indonesian Army; Spanish Army; Philippine Navy
- Number built: 1640 (total); 1404 (German production)

History
- Manufactured: 1967–2001
- Introduction date: 1970
- First flight: 16 February 1967

The Messerschmitt-Bölkow-Blohm Bo 105 is a light, twin-engine, multi-purpose helicopter developed by Bölkow of Ottobrunn, West Germany. It was the first light twin-engine helicopter in the world, and the first rotorcraft that could perform aerobatic maneuvers such as inverted loops. The Bo 105 features a hingeless rotor system, a pioneering innovation in helicopters when it was introduced into service in 1970. Production of the Bo 105 began at the then-recently merged Messerschmitt-Bölkow-Blohm (MBB).

The main production facilities for producing the Bo 105 were located in Germany and Canada; due to the level of export sales encountered, additional manufacturing lines were set up in Spain, Indonesia, and the Philippines. MBB, acquired by DASA in 1989, merged its helicopter division with that of France's Aérospatiale to form Eurocopter in 1992 (rebranded Airbus Helicopters since). The latter continued production of the type until 2001. The Bo 105 was formally replaced in Eurocopter's product range by the newer Eurocopter EC135. By the close of production, over 1400 had been produced in Germany, and with license production 1640 had been produced in total.

== Development ==
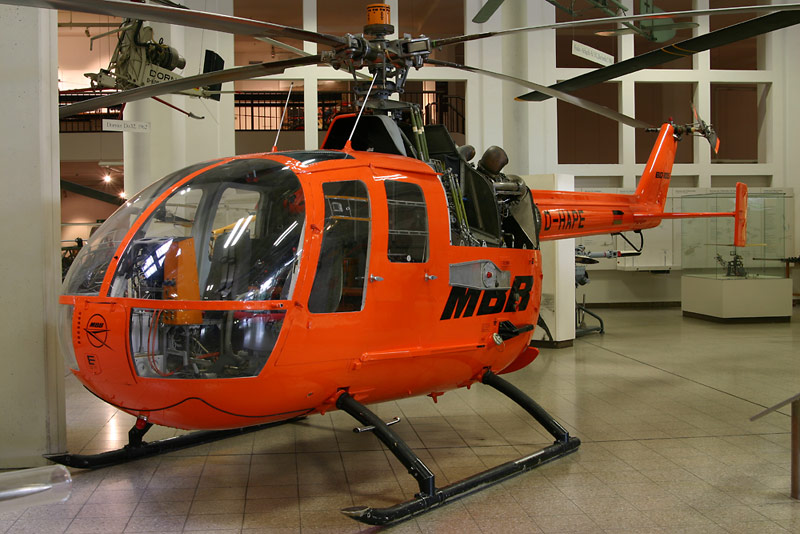
The fourth prototype of the Bo 105, which first flew in 1969, on display at Deutsches Museum

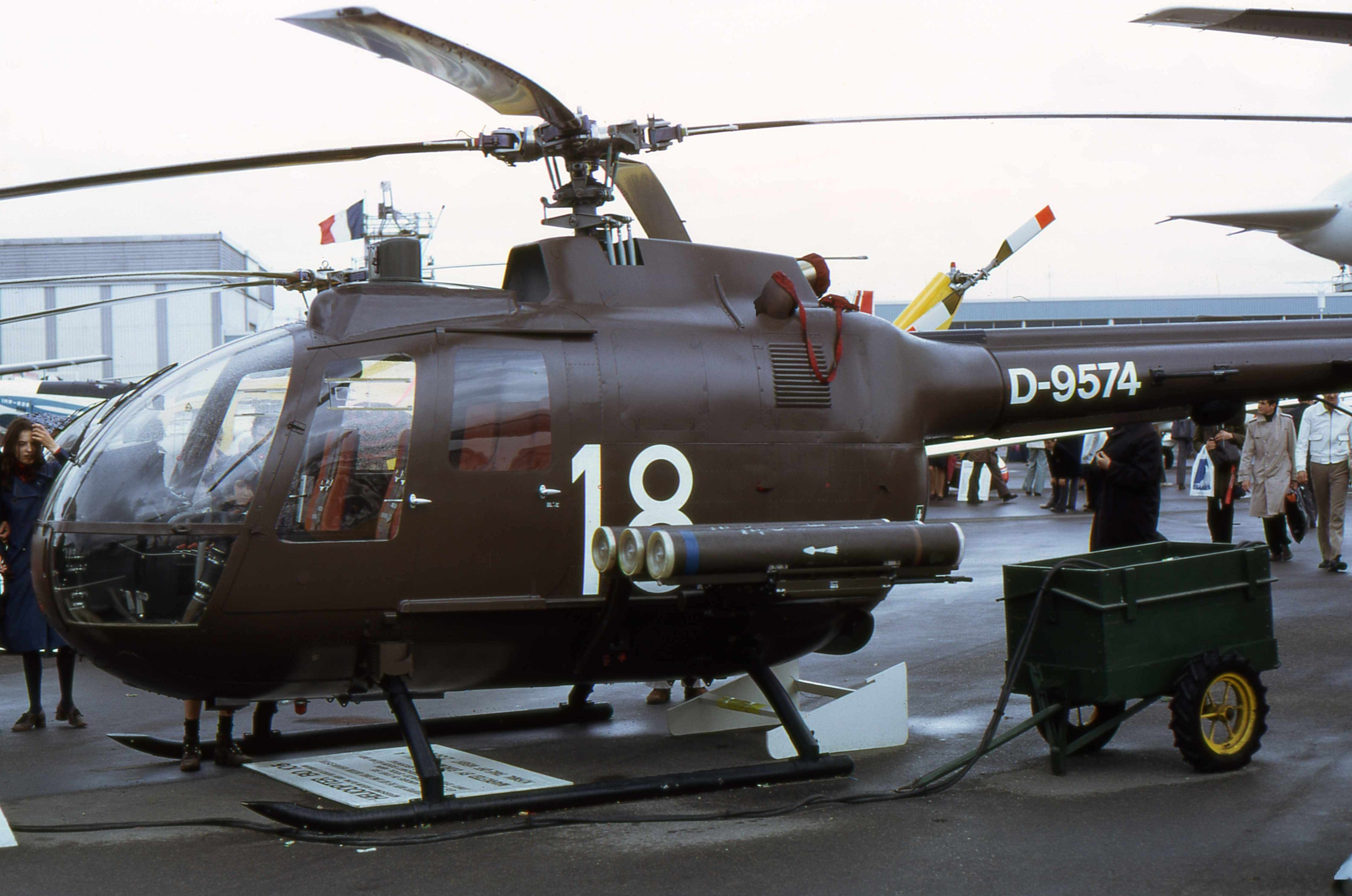
Bo 105C at the 1973 Paris Air Show

In 1964, development work began at Bölkow upon the helicopter that would become the Bo 105, although work on the hingeless rotor it would use had begun earlier. On 16 February 1967, the second Bo 105A prototype conducted its maiden flight at Ottobrunn in Germany; the first public demonstration was held in May 1967. The test program was broken down into stages as the Bo 105 comprised a new airframe, new rotor system, and a new engine; thus the flying Bo 105 prototype was initially equipped with a main rotor from Westland Helicopter's Scout rotorcraft and a pair of Allison Model 250 turboshaft engines instead of their production counterparts. Sud Aviation worked with Bölkow on developing the rotorcraft; an Alouette II helicopter was modified with the Bo 105's rotor and used to test its performance envelope. The third Bo 105 prototype was equipped with the initial production standard MAN Turbo 6022 turboshaft engines; six pre-production Bo 105s were constructed for testing.

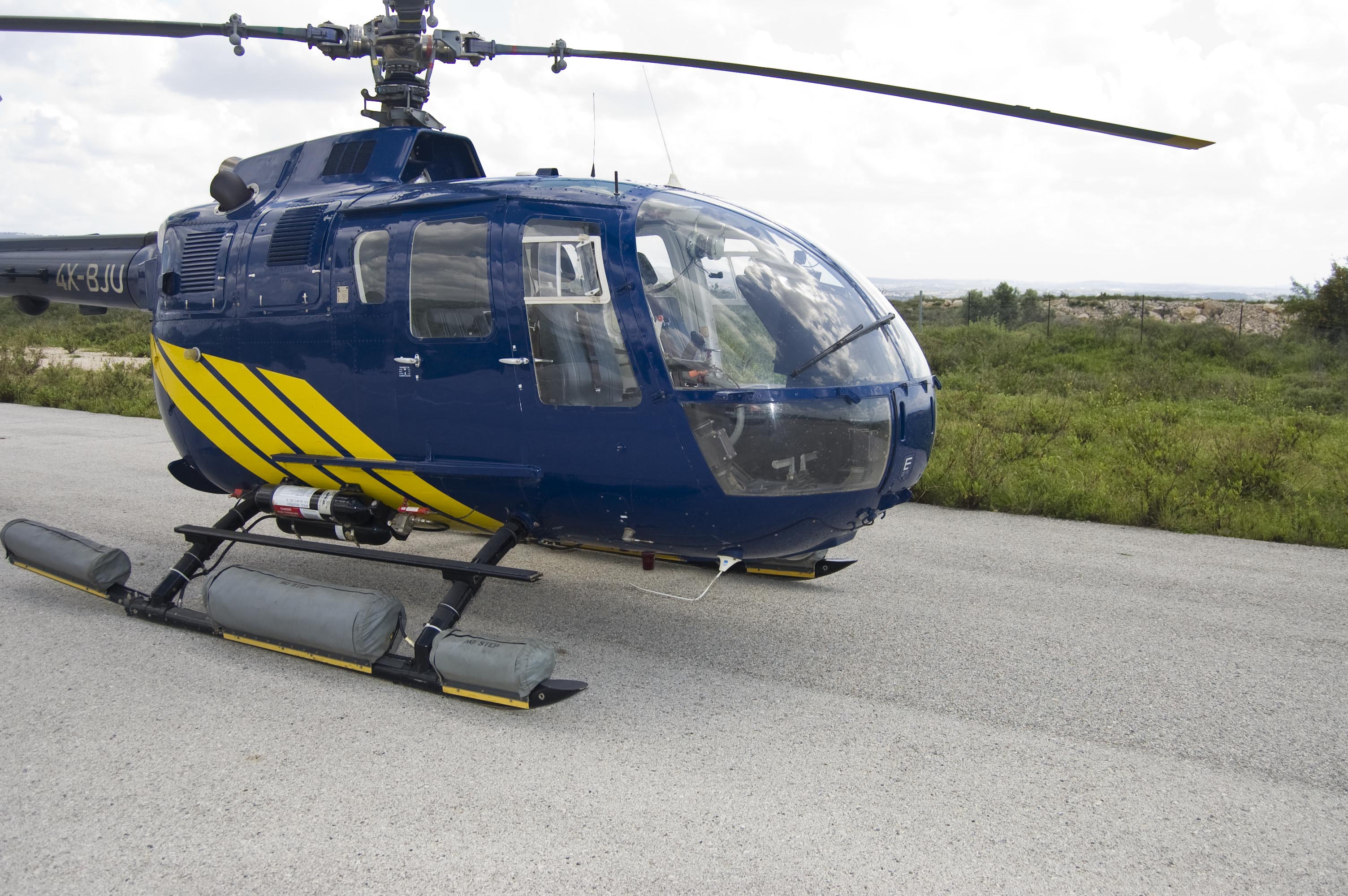
Offshore-configured Bo 105

On 13 October 1970, the German Civil Aviation Authority certified the Bo 105; initial deliveries for the first customers, ADAC Air Rescue and the Bavarian State Police, took place shortly thereafter. In 1972, further type certification was granted by the Federal Aviation Administration (FAA) and the Civil Aviation Authority (CAA), enabling export orders from the United States and Britain respectively, which soon followed. In 1972, an improved version of the rotorcraft with more powerful engines, the Bo 105C, was developed; this model quickly superseded the Bo 105A. On 25 September 1973, the prototype Bo 106 performed its first flight; the Bo 106 shared many similarities to the Bo 105, the principal difference being a widened cabin area, capable of seating three abreast in the front row and four abreast in the rear of the cabin. However, nothing further came of the Bo 106 project.

In 1976, the Bo 105CB, equipped with more powerful Allison 250-C20B engines, was introduced. The Bo 105C was further developed to become the Bo 105CBS, the primary change being a fuselage stretch of 10 inches to meet American demand for emergency medical service (EMS) operations; this version was often referred to as the Bo 105 Twin Jet in the United States. US aerospace firm Boeing-Vertol served as a partner in the type's production and further development, and marketed the BO 105 in the US. The Bo 105 CB and the Bo 105 CBS variants were also subject to license manufacturing agreements, leading to them being produced by the Philippine Aerospace Development Corporation in the Philippines which produced 44 units from 1977-1997, Indonesian Aerospace (IPTN) in Indonesia, and Construcciones Aeronáuticas SA (CASA) in Spain in addition to the main production line in Germany.

In 1984, the Bo 105LS was developed with the enlarged fuselage of the Bo 105CBS combined with uprated Allison 250-C28C engines to increase the maximum take-off weight as well as hot-and-high flight performance; the Bo 105 LS was manufactured under a cooperative arrangement with Eurocopter Canada. Improvements and modifications to the Bo 105 LS continued until 1995.

Production of the Bo 105 by Eurocopter formally ended in 2001, principally due to the type having been superseded by the more modern Eurocopter EC135, itself a direct development from the Bo 105. By the end of production, 1,406 rotorcraft had been manufactured and delivered to operators in 55 nations worldwide. Including the license production in Canada, Indonesia, Philippines and Spain the total is about 1640; of that 1404 were made in Germany.

== Design ==
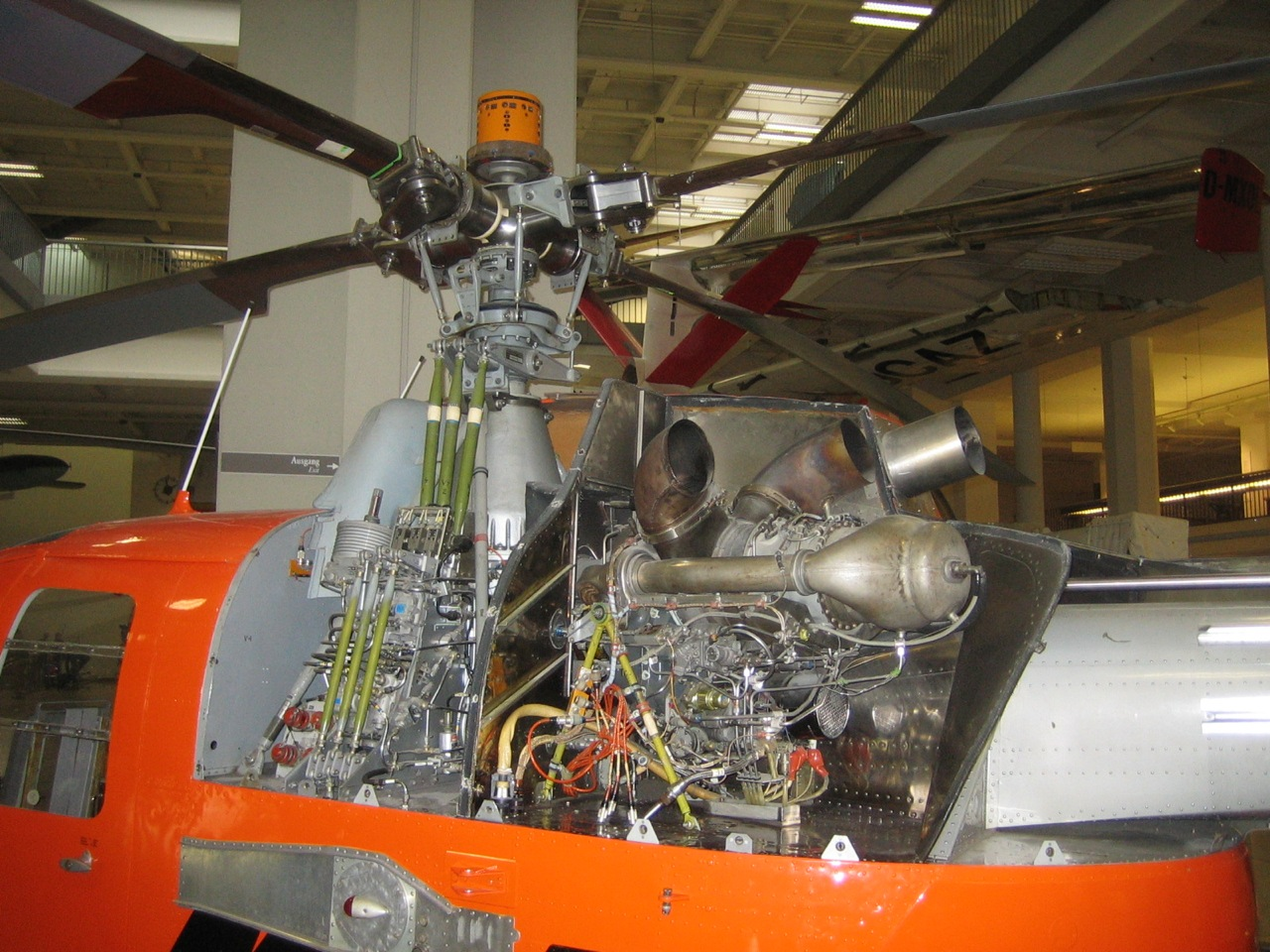
A view of a Bo 105's engine, transmission, and main rotor

The Bo 105 has a reputation for having high levels of maneuverability; certain variants have been designed for aerobatic maneuvers and used for promotional purposes by operators, one such operator in this capacity being professional pilot Aaron Fitzgerald, flying for Red Bull. During the 1970s, the Bo 105 was known for having a great useful load capacity and higher cruise speed than the majority of its competitors. While not being considered a visually attractive helicopter by some pilots, the Bo 105 was known for possessing steady, responsive controls and a good flight attitude. Most models could perform steep dives, rolls, loops, turnovers, and various aerobatic maneuvers; according to MBB the Bo 105 is cleared for up to 3.5 positive G force and one negative. One benefit of the Bo 105's handling and control style is superior takeoff performance, including significant resistance to catastrophic dynamic rollover; a combination of light weight and the twin-engined configuration enables a rapid ascent in a performance takeoff.

Perhaps the most significant feature of the Bo 105 is its rotor blades and rotor head. The rotor system is entirely hingeless, the rotor head consisting of a solid titanium block to which the four blades are bolted; the flexibility of the rotor blades works to absorb movements typically requiring hinges in most helicopter rotor designs. The rotor blades are made from reinforced-plastic glass-fiber composite material; the flexibility of the main rotor allows for active elements other than rotor pitch changes to be removed, greatly simplifying maintenance and extending blade lifespan. The reliability of the advanced rotor system is such that, in over six million operating hours across the fleet, there was a total of zero failures (as of 1991). The rigid rotor design adopted on the Bo 105 has been partially responsible for the type's agility and responsiveness; it remained an uncommon feature on competing helicopters throughout the Bo 105's production life.

Military operators would commonly operate the type at a very low altitude to minimise visibility to enemies, the Bo 105 being well matched to such operations, as the helicopter's flight qualities effectively removed or greatly minimised several of the hazards such a flight profile could pose to pilots. When outfitted with optional auxiliary fuel tanks, a basic model Bo 105 had a flight endurance of roughly five hours under load. In the event of a single engine failure, the Bo 105 could typically continue its flight, albeit with a reduction in cruise speed and range. Besides the two pilots, the cabin can be configured to accommodate up to three passengers on a single rear bench, which can be removed to make room for cargo or a stretcher, which can be loaded and unloaded via the large clamshell doors located at the rear of the fuselage. In a maritime context, the BO 105 can be equipped with auxiliary fuel tanks, emergency flotation equipment, an inflatable life raft, folding rotor blades and high skid landing gear.

== Operational history ==
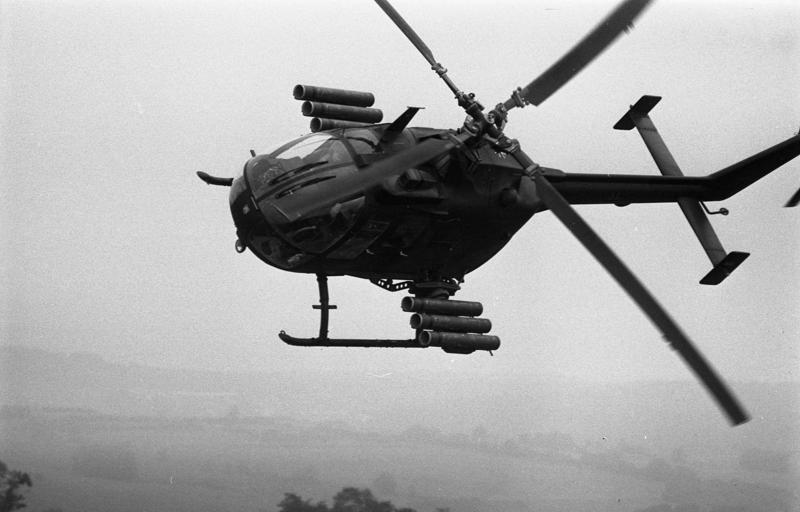
German Army Bo 105, 1986

In 1975, the German Army decided to procure a specialist anti-tank version armed with up to six Euromissile HOT missiles, designated as the Bo 105 PAH-1 (Panzerabwehrhubschrauber, "anti-tank helicopter"). A total of 212 Bo 105 PAH-1s were delivered between 1979 and 1984. German Army leaders saw the PAH-1 as a temporary measure only, having originally sought a more capable anti-tank helicopter; they were particularly dissatisfied with the PAH-1's inability to perform nighttime combat missions and its self-protection capabilities; ultimately, the Eurocopter Tiger was developed as a replacement. In 1977, the German Ministry of Defence selected the Bo 105C for its light observation helicopter (VBH) program, leading to the procurement of another 100 rotorcraft. The helicopter was retired from German Army service on 13 December 2016, the occasion was marked by an 18-aircraft formation flyby from their base in Celle. The Bohicans, as their pilots were called, had clocked over 1.38 million flying hours.

During the 1970s, MBB issued a license to produce the Bo 105 to Indonesian Aerospace (IPTN) as part of a wider agreement to help develop Indonesia's aviation industry. Within ten years, manufacture of the Bo 105 had been entirely localised within IPTN's own facilities. The Bo 105 has been used by various branches of the Indonesian National Armed Forces; military-operated Bo 105s have been reportedly used during the 1999 East Timorese crisis and the Papua conflict. Indonesian Bo 105s have also participated in several large-scale joint exercises.

The Mexican Navy operated a number of armed Bo 105s to perform maritime reconnaissance duties; during the early 1980s, Mexico procured a number of a Uribe-class patrol vessels which were equipped to handle the Bo 105 for off-shore operations. In 2005, work was completed on a series of upgrades to 11 of the Mexican Navy's Bo 105s, having received Forward looking infrared (FLIR) sensors, Global Positioning System (GPS) receivers, search radars, new rotor blades, armament pylons, and other changes. In November 2014, Jet Rescue Air Ambulance inaugurated Mexico's first dedicated civil air ambulance rotorcraft using a Bo 105.

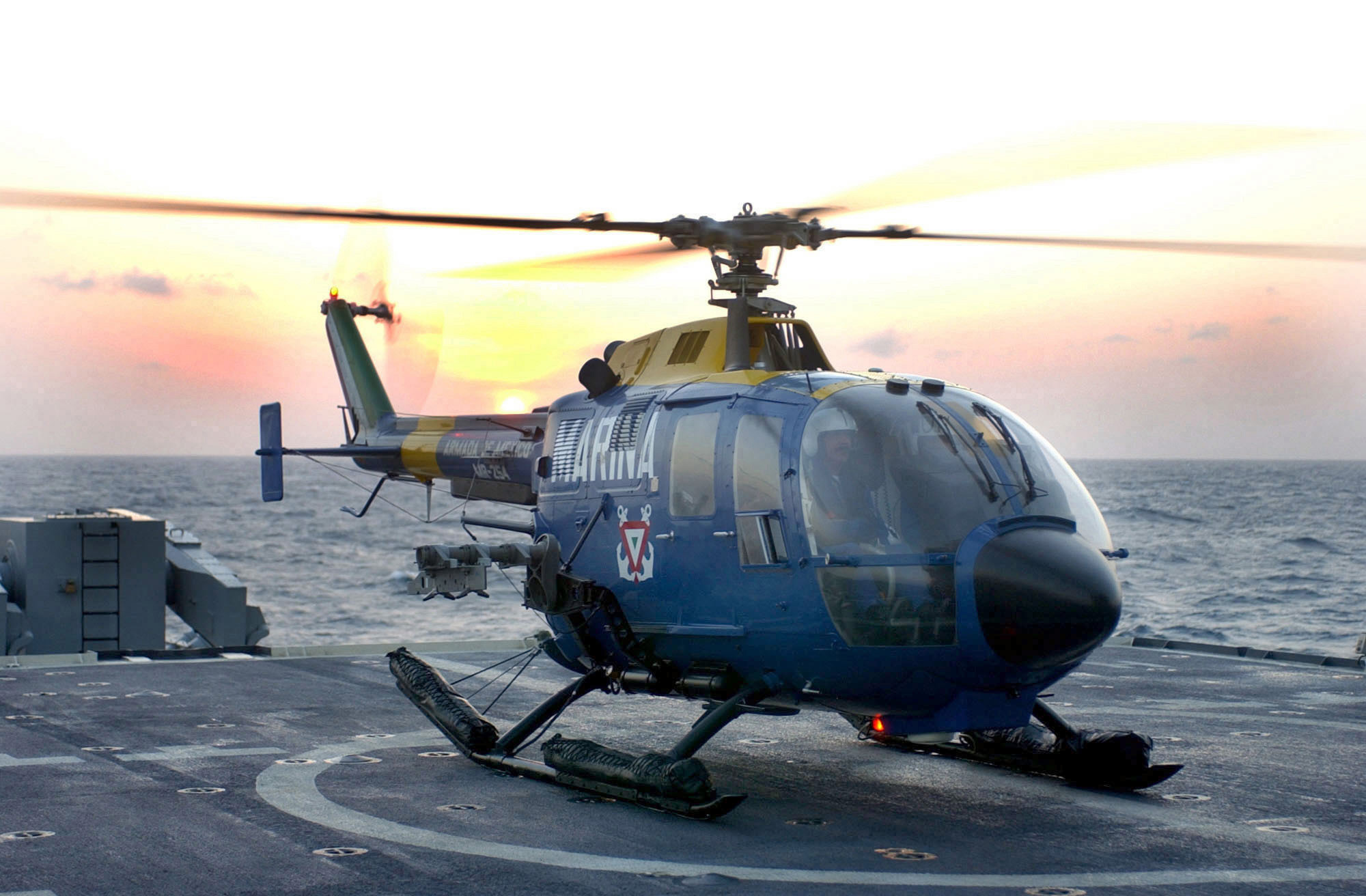
A Mexican Navy Bo 105 on board USS Yorktown, 2002

During the late 1990s, the Republic of Korea Army aviation procured a number of Bo 105s as part of an ongoing drive to improve the force's reconnaissance and surveillance capabilities; these were manufactured under a co-production arrangement between Eurocopter and the newly formed Korea Aerospace Industries (KAI), receiving the designation Korean Light Helicopter (KLH), KAI also promoted the type to export customers.

The Bo 105 gained widespread use by emergency medical service (EMS) / medevac operators; in 1998, Flying Magazine reported that between the Bo 105 and the MBB/Kawasaki BK 117 (a newer rotorcraft derived from the Bo 105), MBB held 35% of the EMS market share. The first EMS-orientated Bo 105 in Scotland entered service in 1989; in November 2015, the last Bo 105 air ambulance operated in Britain was retired, the type having typically been replaced by the newer Eurocopter EC135. In 2009, the last Bo 105 to be produced was purchased by Canadian EMS specialist Dam Helicopters.

In May 2014, Airbus Helicopter reported that, worldwide, the Bo 105 had accumulated 8 million flight hours, and that approximately 700 Bo 105s remained in service.

== Variants ==
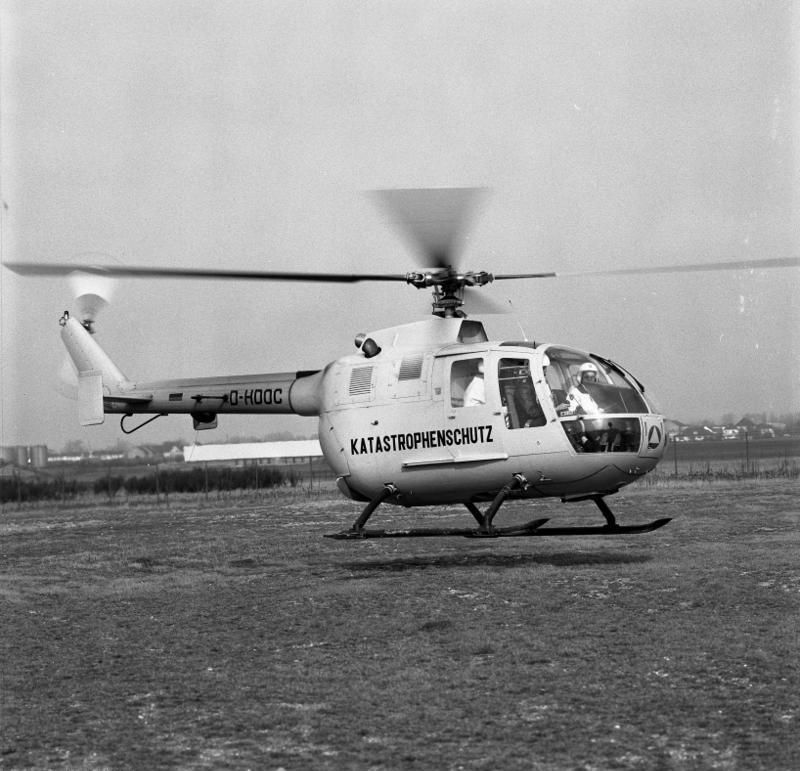
1974

The variants used by the German Army are the Bo 105P and Bo 105M.

Bo 105A
First production model primarily for civil use and equipped with two Allison 250-C18 turbine engines.
Bo 105ATH
HOT-armed anti-tank version for the Spanish Army. Local designation HA.15.
Bo 105C
Initial version. Developed in 1972 and equipped with two Allison 250-C20 turbines engines.
Bo 105CB
Main production version from 1975, powered by two 313 kW (420 shp) Allison 250-C20B engines.

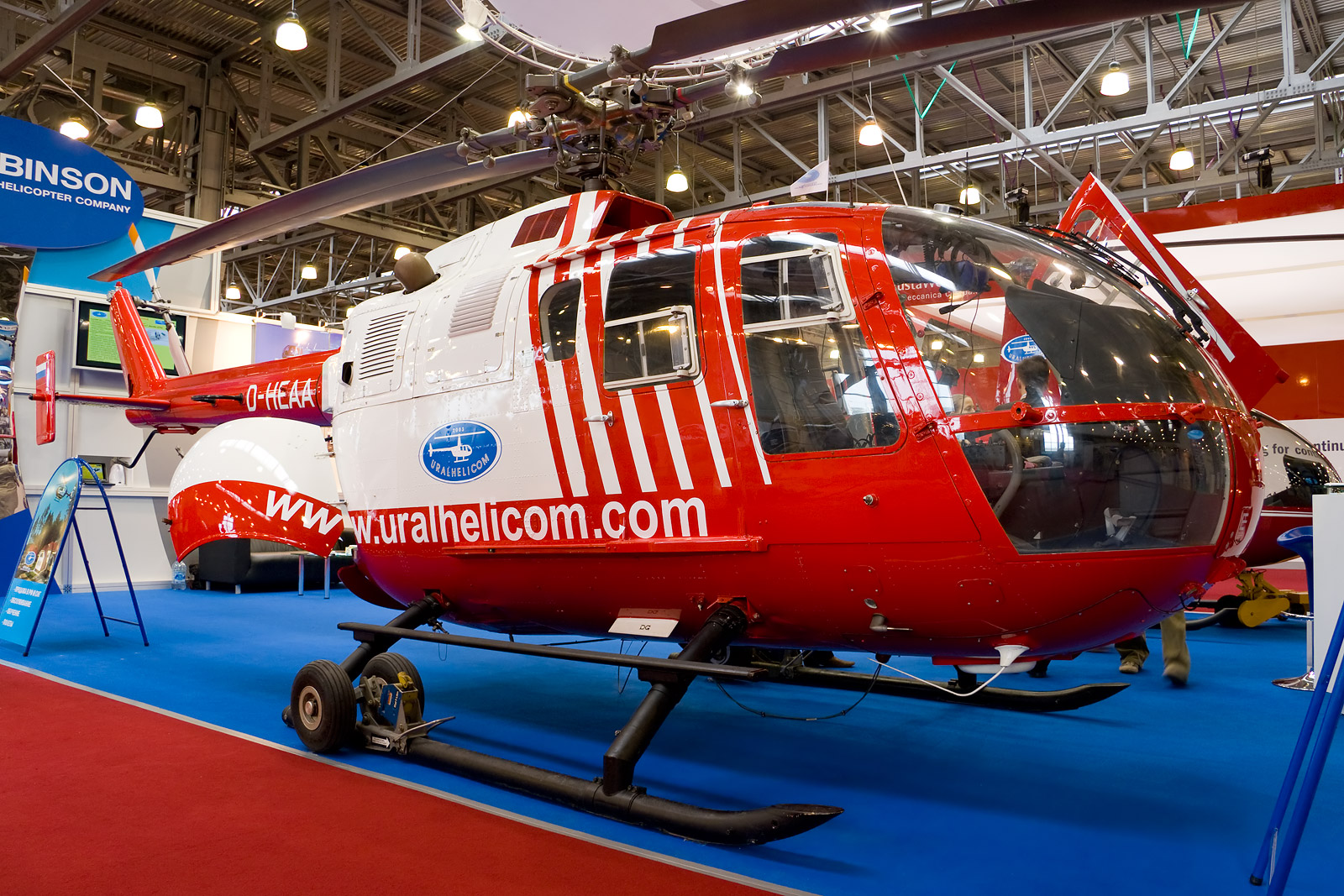
Russian MBB Bo 105 at HeliRussia 2008

Bo 105CBS
Utility transport version, with the fuselage stretched by 25 cm (9.8 in) and an extra window.
EC-Super Five
High performance version of the Bo 105CBS.
Bo 105CBS-5
Also known as Superfive, with increased lifting capabilities similar to the LS A3 Superlifter
Bo 105D
UK certified offshore version.
Bo 105GSH
Armed scout version for the Spanish Army. Local designation HR.15.
Bo 105HGH
A high speed research variant with aerodynamic refinements, such as a rotor head fairing, rear fuselage fairing, small individual skids and 6 m (20 ft) long fixed auxiliary wings.
Bo 105 KLH
license-produced combat version of CBS-5 custom-fitted with Korean mission equipment package including communication, navigation, electronic warfare and target acquisition system, to meet Republic of Korea Army's operational requirements. KLH also has greatly improved rotor blade and transmission system. 12 are in service.
Bo 105LOH
Observation version for the Spanish Army. Local designation HR.15.
Bo 105LS A1
Developed in 1984 with stretched fuselage and two Allison 250-C28C turbine engines.
Bo 105LS A3
Developed in 1986 with maximum take-off weight increased to 2,600 kg.
Bo 105LS A3 "Superlifter"
Developed in 1995 with maximum mission weight increased to 2,850 kg.
Bo 105M
Light transport and surveillance helicopter for West German Army. German Army designation VBH (Verbindungshubschrauber; 'liaison helicopter'). They were phased out and replaced by disarmed and modified PAH1.: Bo 105P1M: Disarmed Bo 105P for light multi-purpose tasks as a replacement for the Bo 105M.
Bo 105MSS
Maritime version, fitted a search radar.
Bo 105P/BSH
Proposed modification of PAH-1s into escort version for the German Army, armed with Stinger air-to-air missiles. Cancelled 1993.

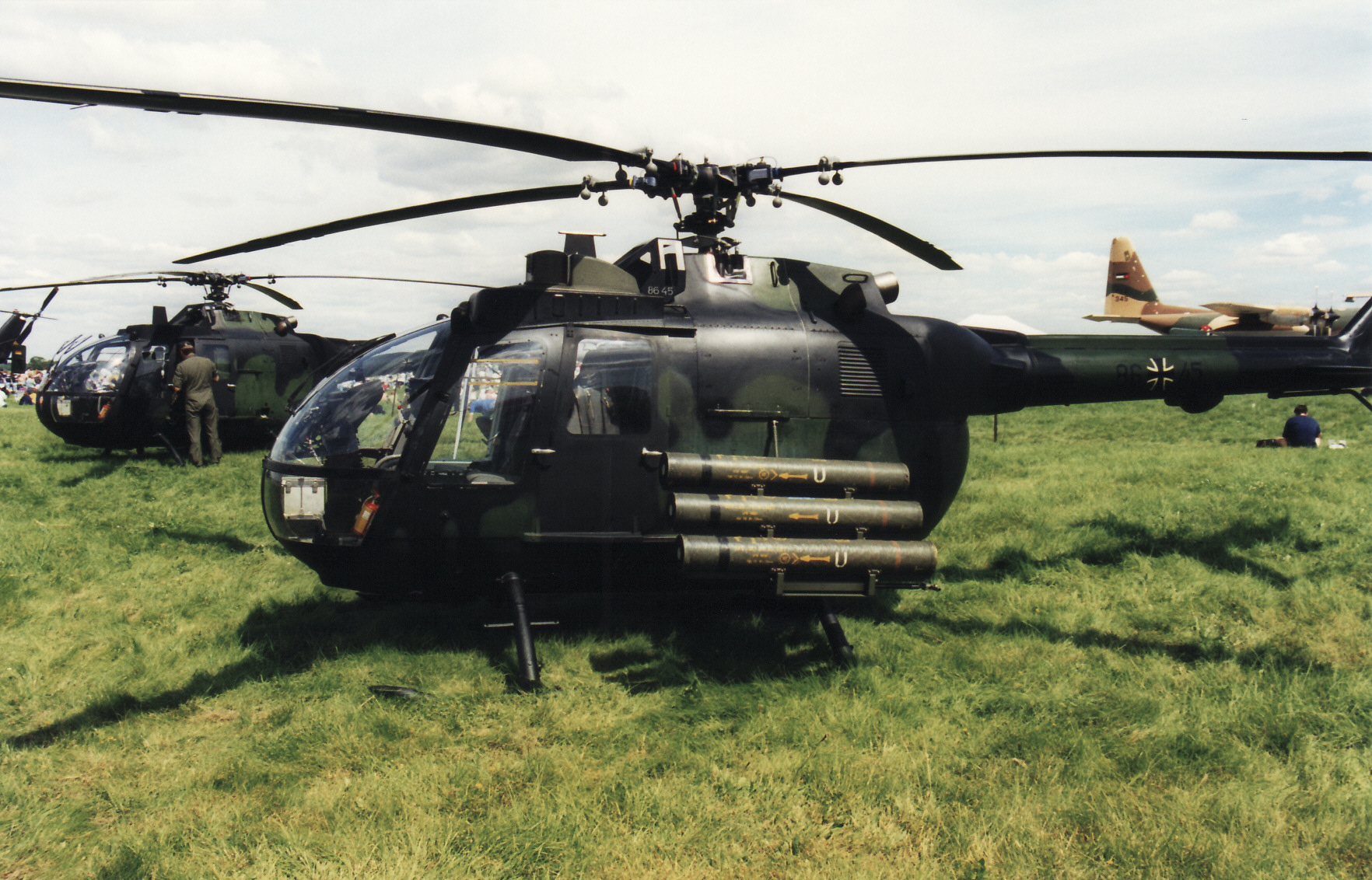
Bo 105P at RIAT 1998

Bo 105P/PAH-1
Anti-tank helicopter armed with wire-guided HOT ATGMs for West German Army. German Army designation "PAH-1" (PAH=Panzerabwehrhubschrauber; 'Anti-tank helicopter'). Following the arrival of the Eurocopter Tiger attack helicopter, some were retired while others disarmed and downgraded to the VBH version for continued service.
Bo 105P/PAH-1A1
Upgrade of PAH-1 anti-tank version for the German Army.
Bo 105P/PAH-1 Phase 2
Planned further upgraded version of PAH-1 with infra-red roof mounted sight for HOT-2 missiles giving a night attack capability. Programme cancelled 1993.
Bo 105S
Search and rescue version.
Bo 105/Ophelia
Test and trials aircraft fitted with a mast-mounted sight.
NBO-105
Were Manufactured by IPTN under license from MBB (now Airbus Helicopters) 1976–2011; only rotors and transmission now supplied by Germany; originally NBO-105 CB, but stretched NBO-105 CBS available from 101st aircraft onwards. 122 were produced, Dirgantara Indonesia stopped production in 2008.
NBO-105S
Stretched version.
Bo 105 Executaire
Boeing Vertol and Carson Helicopters manufactured a 24.5 cm stretched version of the Bo 105 under license as the Executaire in an attempt to break into the U.S. light helicopter market, but sales were dismal.
Bo 105E-4
12 German Army Bo 105P upgraded and overhauled for a 10 million euro contract and donated to Albania first batch delivered in 2006, the helicopters have better performance and avionics. The conversion of other Bo 105 helicopters from the German Armed Forces is also under consideration with a view to future sales.
Bo 106
Widened cabin to seat 7 instead of 5. First flight was on 26 September 1973. A single helicopter of that variant has been made (registration D-HDCI, serial no. 84). The Bo 106 was also equipped with more powerful Allison 250 C 20B engines. In 1981, the German air rescue organization Deutsche Rettungsflugwacht/DRF Luftrettung bought that prototype and had it rebuilt into a 105 CB-2 with a standard cabin. It flew for DRF until November 1993 under the registration D-HCCC, but in 1994 it was put aside to gain spare parts for another DRF helicopter (Bo 105 CBS-S, registration D-HNNN, serial number 662).
Philippine Aerospace Development CorporationHummingbird
An unlicensed development of the Bo 105C with revised cockpit structure.
Indonesian Aerospace Bumblebee-001
Proposed tandem-seat attack helicopter design based on NBO-105 airframe developed by Indonesian Aerospace and Indonesian Army Research and Development Service in 2010. It would have a length of 12.6 m (41 ft), maximum take off weight of 2,500 kg (5,500 lb), and maximum range of 555 km (345 mi).

== Operators ==
=== Military ===
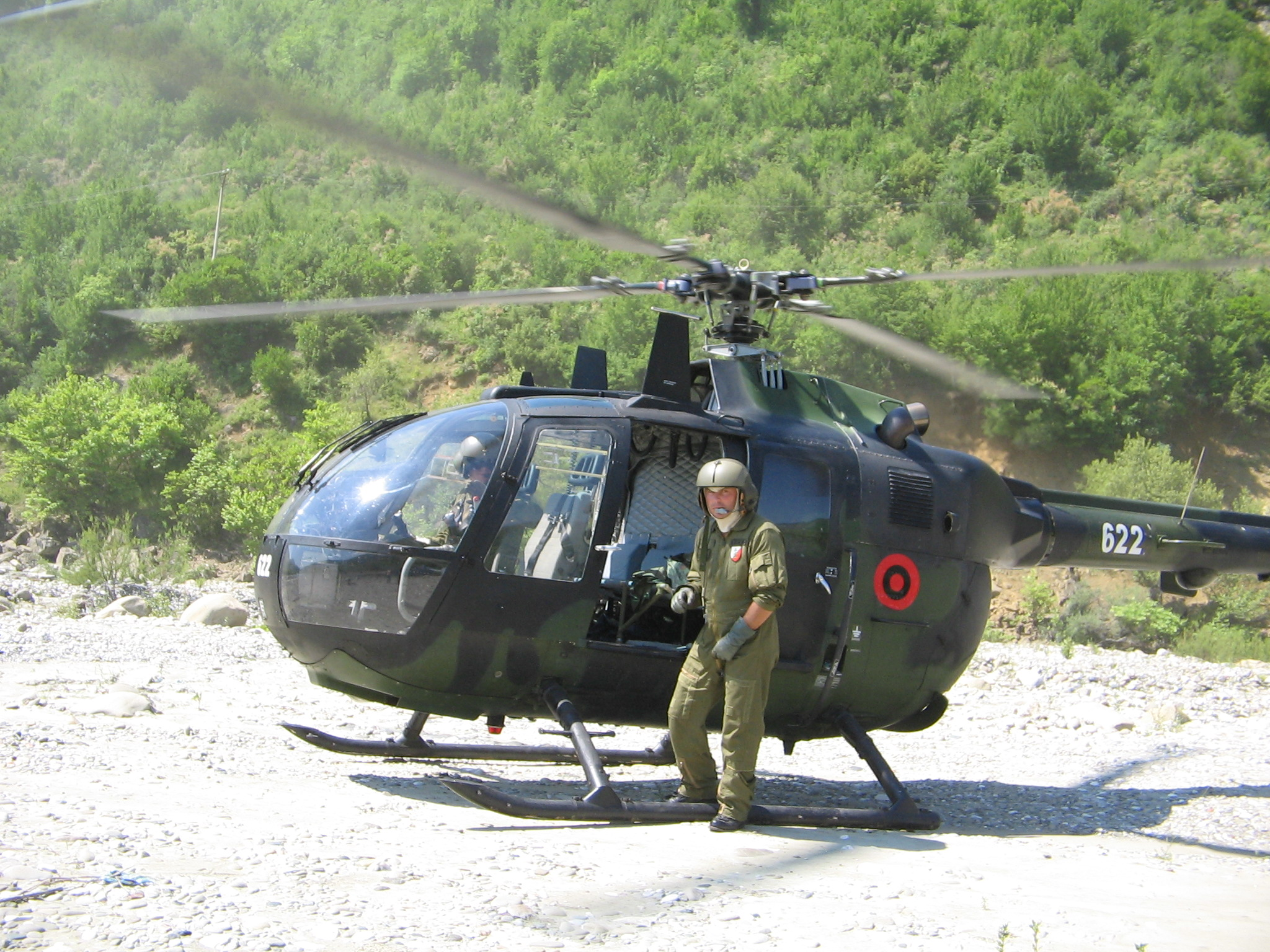
The first Bo 105E-4 that entered service with the Albanian Air Brigade, 2006

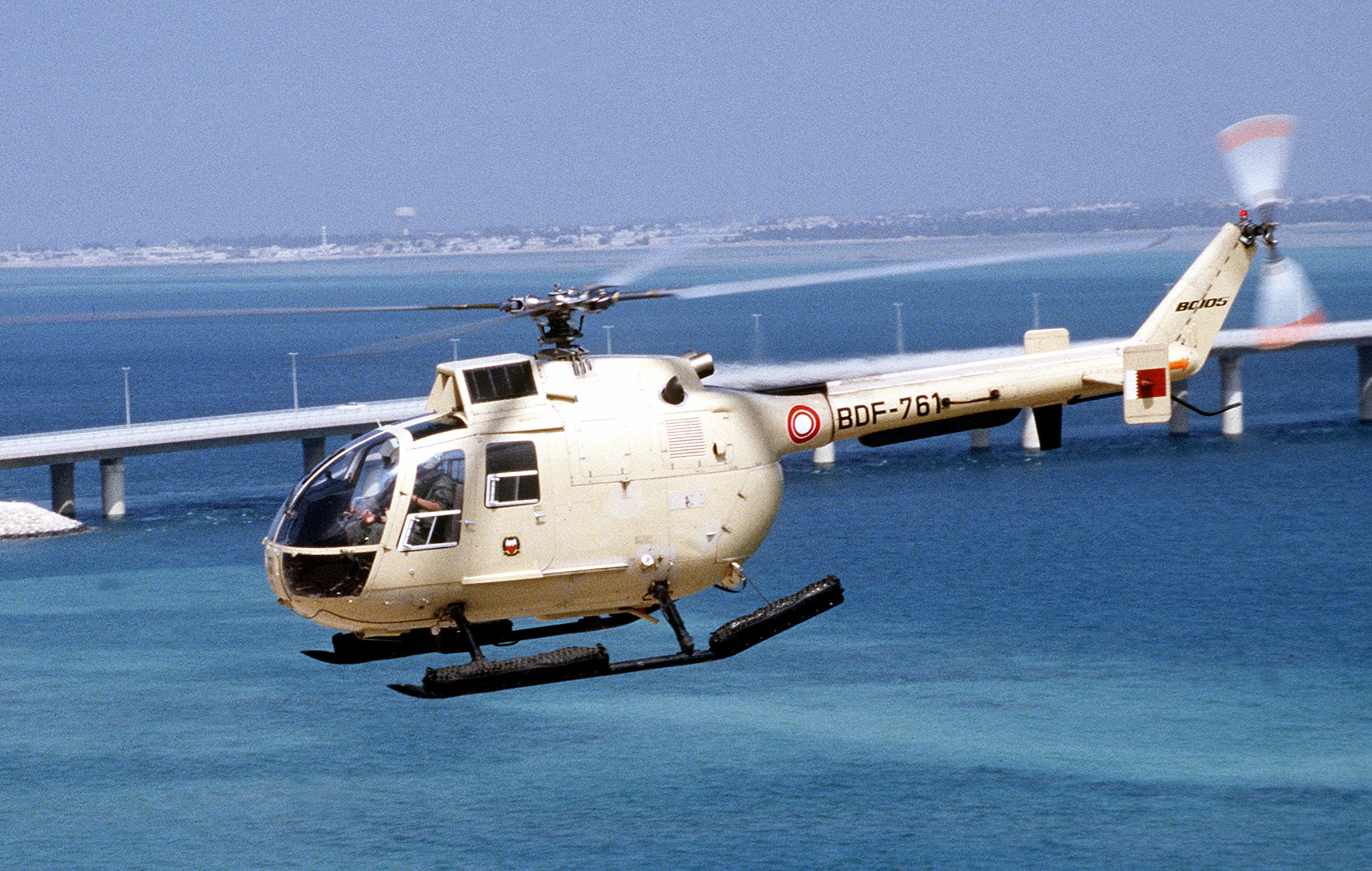
Bahraini Bo 105 in 1991

Albania

- Albanian Air Force –4 units.

Bahrain

- Royal Bahraini Air Force – 4 units.
- Royal Bahrain Naval Force – 2 units

Canada

- International Test Pilots School

Chile

- Chilean Navy – 4 units.

Colombia

- Colombian Navy

Honduras

- Honduran Air Force - 1 unit.

Indonesia

- Indonesian Army –12 units
- Indonesian Navy – 8 units

Mexico

- Mexican Navy

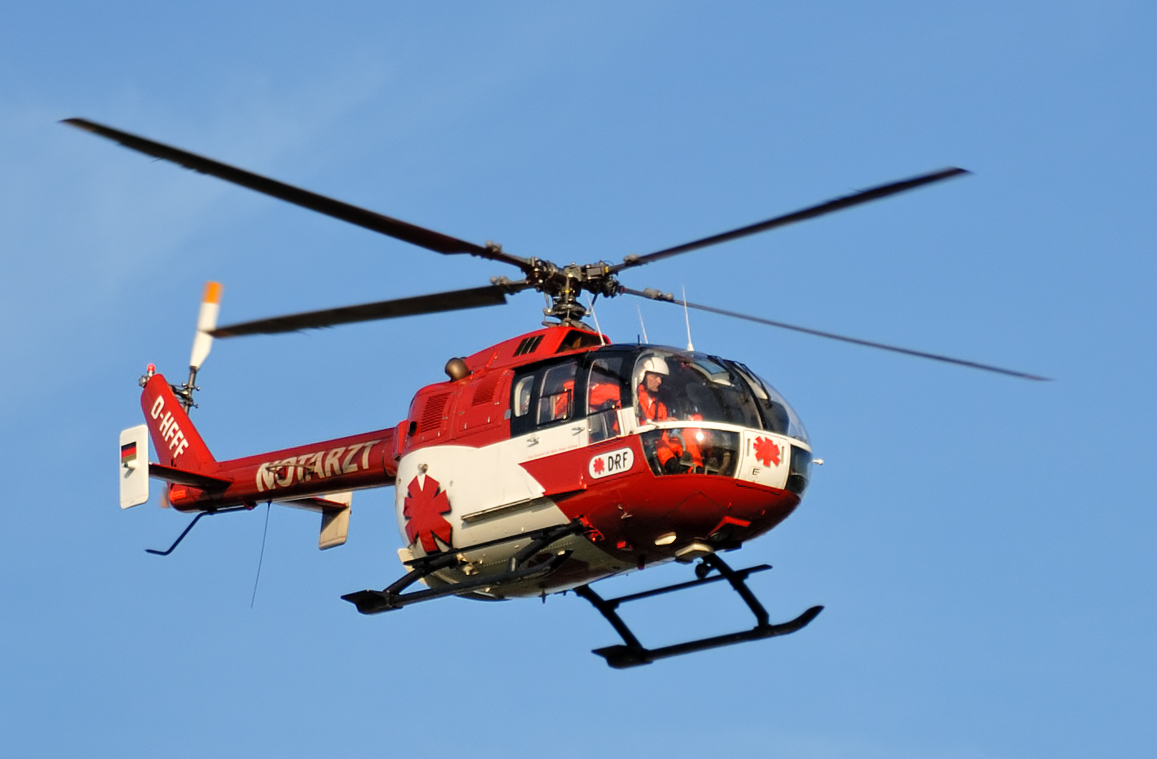
A Notarzt Bo 105C EMS helicopter

Peru

- Peruvian Air Force – 2 units.

Philippines

- Philippine Army – 2 units active out 4 in inventory in 2024.

South Korea

- Republic of Korea Army – 12 units.

Sudan

- Sudanese Air Force

Spain

- Spanish Army

Ukraine

- Armed Forces of Ukraine — 1 unit.

=== Government ===
Argentina

- Buenos Aires Province Police
- Santa Fe Province Police
- Policía Federal Argentina
- Módena Helicópteros lease to paramedic services.

Chile

- Carabineros de Chile

Indonesia

- Indonesian National Police
- National Search and Rescue Agency
- National Disaster Management Authority

Philippines

- Philippine Coast Guard

Russia

- Ministry of Emergency Situations

South Africa

- South African Police Service

Spain

- Customs Service
- National Police
- Civil Guard

=== Civilian ===
Pakistan

- Used by Princely Jets

=== Former ===
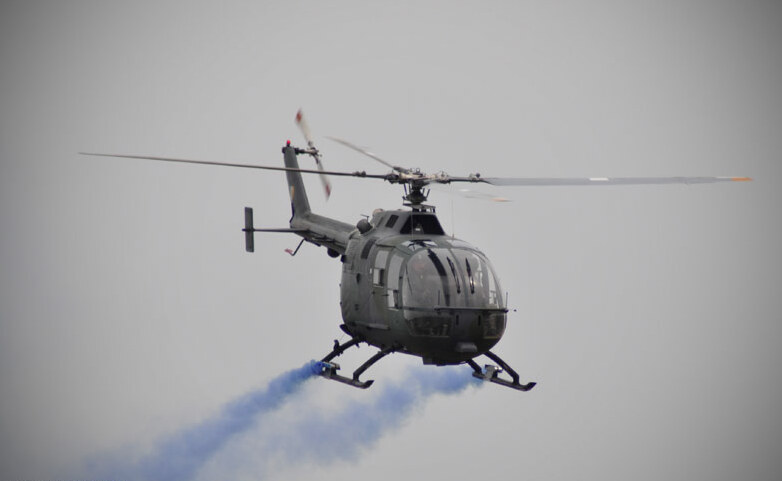
Royal Brunei Air Force BO105-CBS in flight, 2009

Brunei

- Royal Brunei Air Force – operated by No. 12 Squadron (originally known as 2 Squadron), retired February 2022

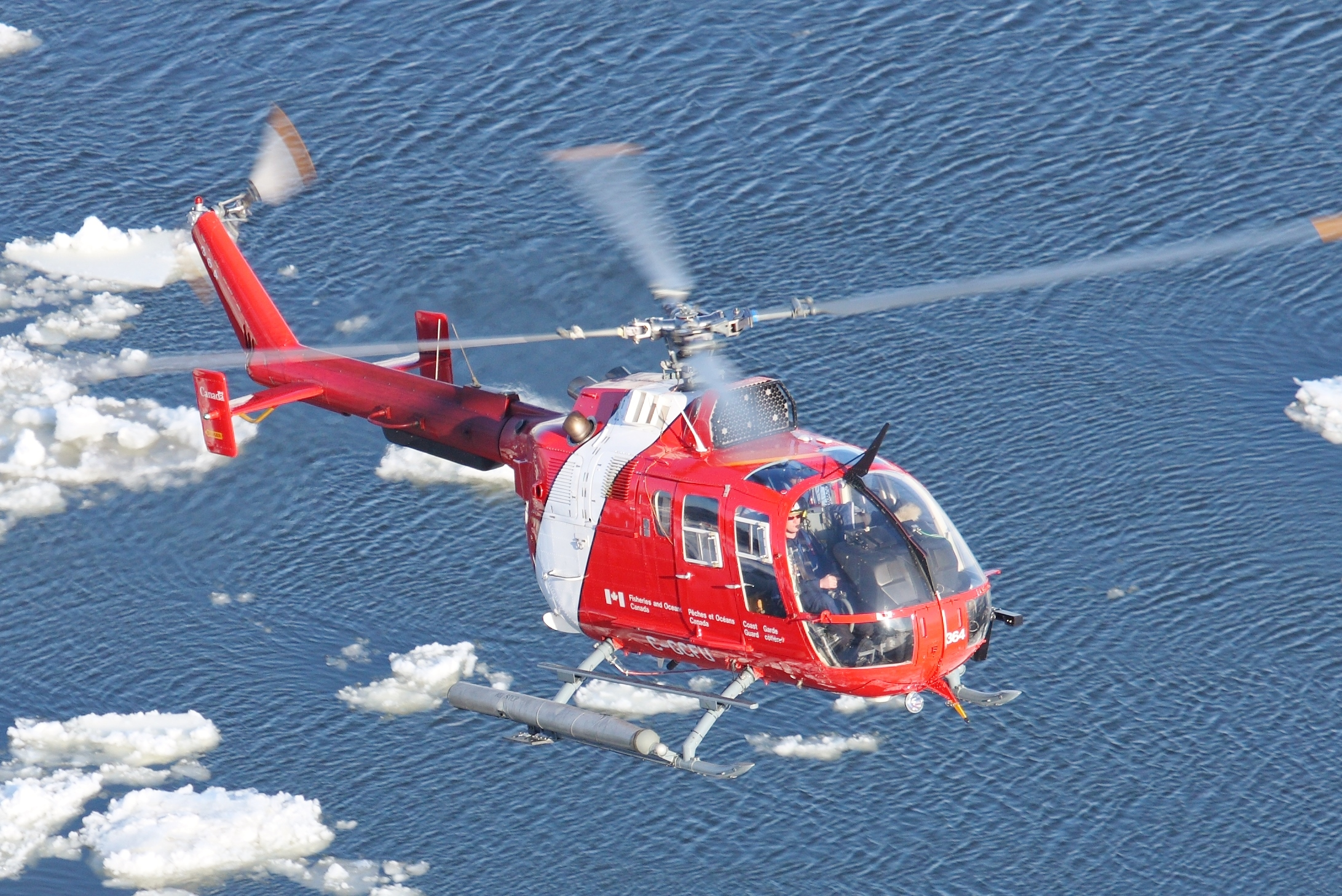
A Canadian Coast Guard MBB Bo 105 over St. Lawrence River near Quebec City

Canada

- Canadian Coast Guard - all retired in 2016 after Bell 429 delivered

Chile

- Chilean Air Force

Ciskei

- Ciskei Defence Force

Finland

- FinnHEMS

Germany

- German Army

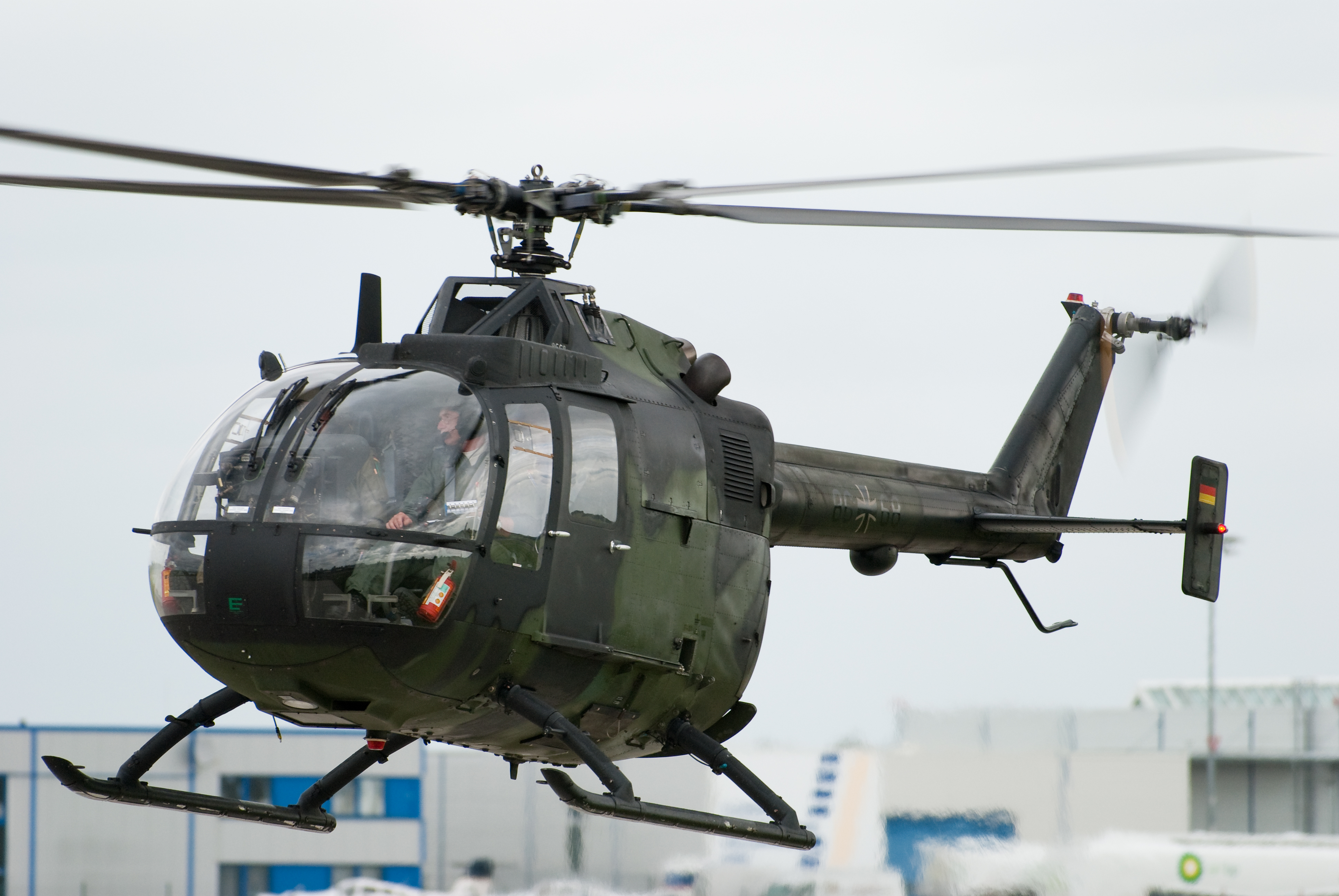
German Army Bo 105P in flight

Iraq

- Iraqi Air Force

Netherlands

- Royal Netherlands Air Force
- Dutch Aviation Police

Nigeria

- Nigerian Air Force

Philippines

- Philippine Air Force

Sierra Leone

- Sierra Leone Air Arm

Sudan

- Sudanese Police Force

Sweden

- Swedish Air Force Hkp9B four Bo 105CB4 used for light air rescue, equipped with winch

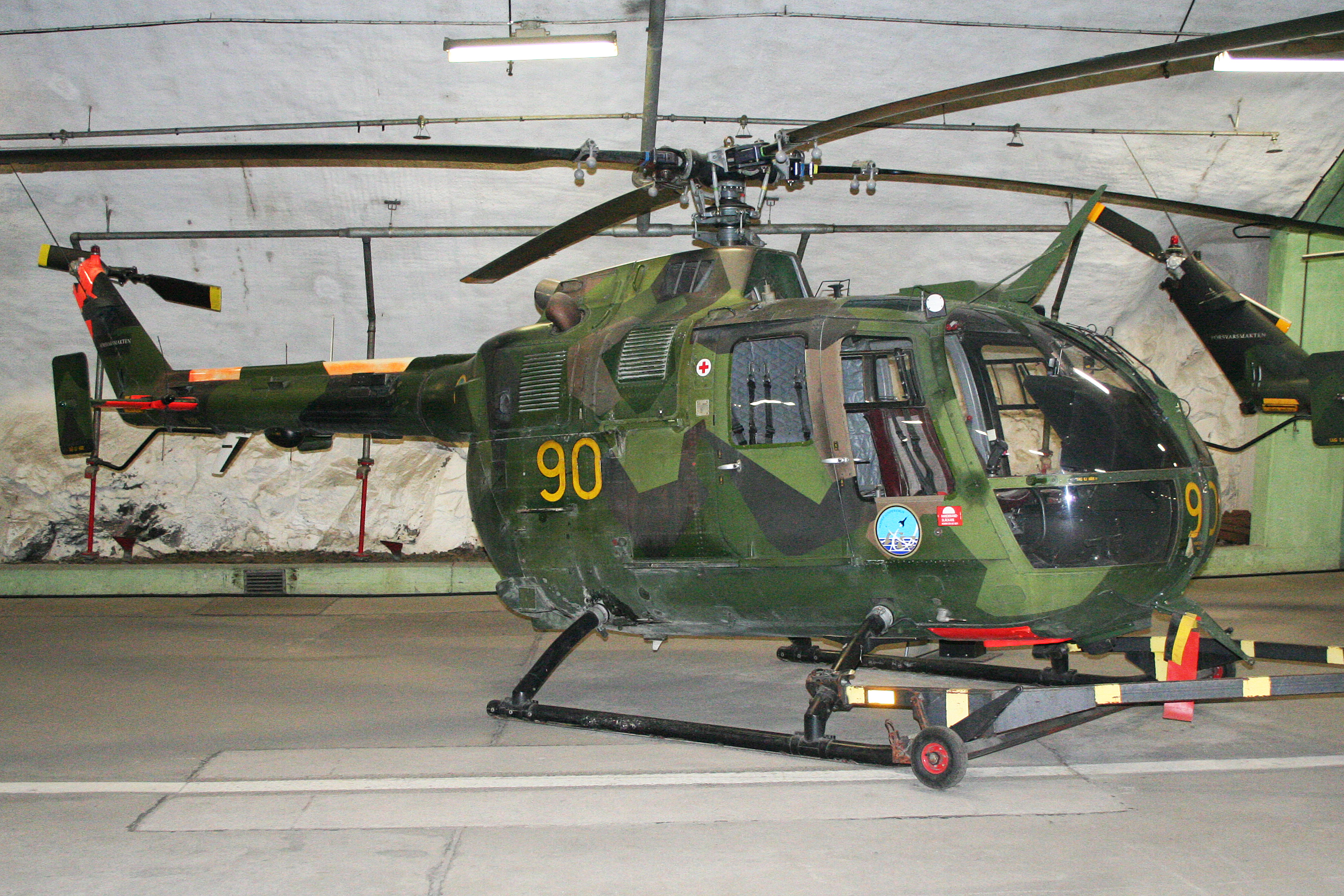
A Hkp9A of the Swedish Army

- Swedish Army
  - Arméflyget, Hkp 9A, 21 Bo 105CB3 aircraft used as anti-tank missile carriers equipped with four SAAB HeliTOW between 1987 and 1998, with one company stationed in AF 1, Boden, and the other company in Af 2, Linköping. In 1998, they were transferred to:
  - Försvarsmaktens helikopterflottilj: where all helicopters in the Swedish armed forces fell under common command; here the Hkp 9A were disarmed and used for light transports and schooling until 2009.

Trinidad and Tobago

- Trinidad and Tobago Defence Force

United Arab Emirates

- United Arab Emirates Air Force

United States

- New York Police Department
- Petroleum Helicopters Inc.

Uruguay

- Uruguayan Navy

== Accidents and incidents ==
- On 17 August 2010 a Philippine Navy PADC/MBB Bo 105C serial 411 crashed near Zamboanga City with two casualties.
- 21 August 2012 a Philippine Navy PADC/MBB Bo 105C serial involved in search and recovery efforts for the bodies of Interior Secretary Jesse Robredo ditched in Masbate due to engine trouble and came to rest in waist-deep water. All occupants were uninjured.
- 27 June 2017 - A hijacked Bo 105 of the Venezuelan criminal investigation agency (CICPC) was used to attack the Supreme Tribunal of Justice and the Interior Ministry in Caracas, Venezuela.
- On 27 November 2022, an NBO-105 helicopter with registration number P-1103 belonging to the Indonesian National Police crashed in the waters of Bangka Belitung Islands, caused by bad weather. A search for the crew was carried out by the National Police with joint search and rescue team until 18 December 2022. Four crew members on board the helicopter were declared dead, with three bodies recovered and one missing.
- On 8 September 2026, a Bo 105 helicopter belonging to Flying Doctors of Malaysia crashed near Long Lellang, killing all five people on board.

== Aircraft on display ==
=== Argentina ===
- Bo 105 registration LV-LGR that fought in the Falklands War on display at the Museo Nacional de Aeronáutica in Morón, Buenos Aires.
- Bo 105CBS registration LQ-AOF of the Argentine Federal Police on display at the Museo Nacional de Aeronáutica in Morón, Buenos Aires.

=== Colombia ===
- A Bo 105CB registration ARC 202 of the Colombian Navy is on display at the History Museum of the Armed Forces of Colombia, Tocancipá

=== Germany ===
- Since 2011 a Bo 105 in yellow rescue livery is part of an art installation by Alfred Gockel at the Kamener Kreuz (Autobahn intersection of A1 and A2 in Germany).
- A Bo 105P, MSN V-04, registered as D-HAPE, the fourth prototype of the Bo 105, which first flew in 1969, on display at Deutsches Museum.
- A Bo 105S, MSN S-868, registered as D-HILF, painted in yellow ADAC colors, on display at Munich Airport Besucherpark.

=== Indonesia ===
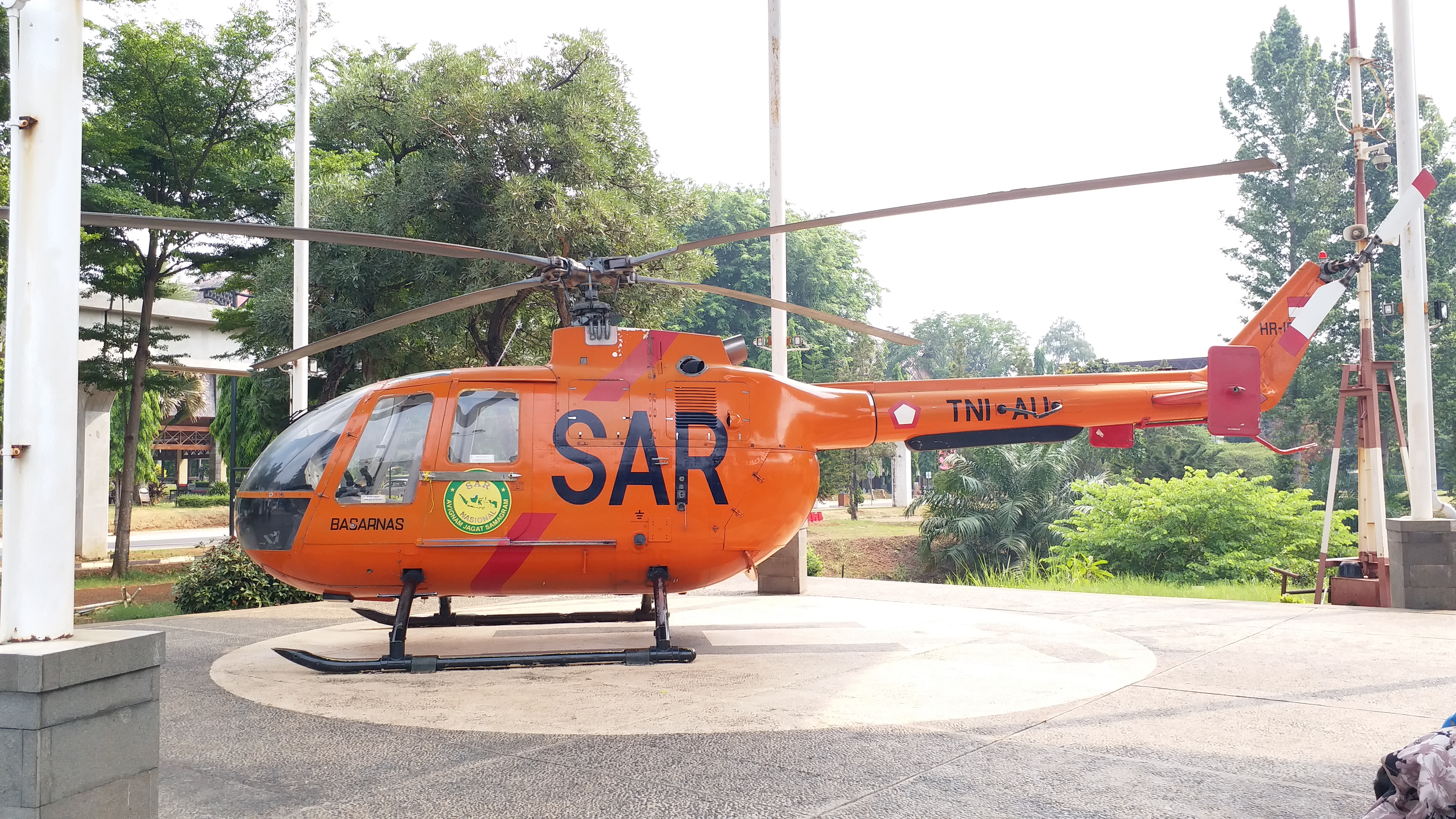
Indonesian Air Force NBo 105CB rescue helicopter at Taman Mini Indonesia Indah, Jakarta

- Bo 105C registration P-4005 of the Indonesian National Police is on display at Aceh Tsunami Museum in Banda Aceh, Aceh.
- NBo 105CB registration P-4004 of the Indonesian National Police is on display in Police Staff and Leaders School in Lembang, West Java.
- NBo 105CB registration HE-4103 of the Indonesian Navy is on display at Indonesian Naval Aviation Museum in Surabaya, East Java.
- NBo 105CB registration HE-4116 of the Indonesian Navy is on display at Indonesian Navy Central Museum in Surabaya, East Java.
- NBo 105CB registration HR-1525 of the Indonesian Air Force/National Search and Rescue Agency is on display at Transportation Museum of Taman Mini Indonesia Indah, East Jakarta.

=== Philippines ===
==== Philippine Navy ====
- Bo 105C serial 402, Philippine Navy is on display at Air Power Park, Philippine Military Academy, Baguio City, Philippines.
- Bo 105C serial 142, Philippine Navy is on display at Naval Station Jose Andrada, City of Manila, Philippines.
- Bo 105C serial 422, Philippine Navy is on display at Philippine Navy Museum, Fort San Felipe, Cavite City, Philippines.

==== Philippine National Police ====
- Bo 105CBS serial 972, Integrated National Police is on static display at the Philippine National Police Museum, Camp General Rafael T. Crame in Quezon City, Philippines.

=== United Kingdom ===
==== Cornwall Air Ambulance ====
- Bo 105DBS-4 UK Registration G-CDBS: This aircraft is on display at the Cornwall Air Ambulance Exhibit at Land's End in Cornwall.

== Specifications (Bo 105CB) ==
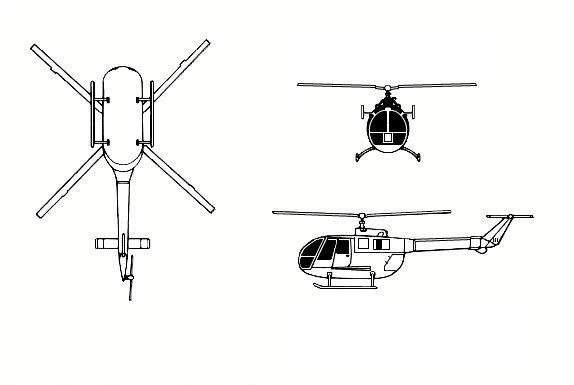

External videos
- Documentary on Bo 105P PAH1 attack helicopter
- Bo 105 performing acrobatic display

Data from Jane's All the World's Aircraft 1988-89 Worldwide Equipment Guide – Volume 2: Airspace and Air Defense Systems

General characteristics

- Crew: 1 or 2 pilots
- Capacity: 3 or 4 passengers
- Length: 11.86 m (38 ft 11 in) (total length - including rotors)
- Height: 3.00 m (9 ft 10 in)
- Airfoil: NACA 23012
- Empty weight: 1,276 kg (2,813 lb)
- Max takeoff weight: 2,500 kg (5,512 lb)
- Fuel capacity: 570 L (150 US gal; 130 imp gal)
- Powerplant: 2 × Allison 250-C20B turboshaft engines, 310 kW (420 shp) each
- Main rotor diameter: 9.84 m (32 ft 3 in)
- Main rotor area: 76.05 m^{2} (818.6 sq ft)

Performance

- Maximum speed: 242 km/h (150 mph, 131 kn)
- Cruise speed: 204 km/h (127 mph, 110 kn) (best range cruise)
- Never exceed speed: 270 km/h (170 mph, 150 kn)
- Range: 657 km (408 mi, 355 nmi) at 1,525 m (5,000 ft) (standard fuel, maximum payload)
- Ferry range: 1,112 km (691 mi, 600 nmi) at 1,525 m (5,000 ft) (with auxiliary tanks)
- Endurance: 3 hr 30 min (standard fuel, maximum payload)
- Service ceiling: 5,200 m (17,000 ft)
- Rate of climb: 8.00 m/s (1,575 ft/min)

Armament

- Rockets: 2 × 12 SNEB or 2 × 28 SNIA
- Missiles: 6 × Euromissile HOT (Bo 105 P) or 8 × BGM-71 TOW or 4 × Air-to-Air Stinger

== See also ==
Related development

- Eurocopter EC135
- Eurocopter EC145
- MBB/Kawasaki BK 117
- MBB Bo 115

Aircraft of comparable role, configuration, and era

- Aérospatiale Gazelle
- Eurocopter AS355 Écureuil 2
- Bell 407
- Bell 427
- Bell 206
- MD Helicopters MD Explorer
- Westland Lynx

Related lists

- List of rotorcraft
- List of most-produced rotorcraft
