= MBB Bo 115 =

Prototype attack helicopter

The Messerschmitt-Bölkow-Blohm Bo 115 was a prototype light, twin-engine, attack helicopter developed by Messerschmitt-Bölkow-Blohm of Ottobrunn, Germany, powered by two Allison 250-C20 turboshafts, and 8 anti-tank missiles. It was based on the mechanical elements of the MBB Bo 105.

== See also ==
Related development

- MBB Bo 105

Aircraft of comparable role, configuration, and era

- Bell 206

Related lists

- List of rotorcraft
