= Philippine Aerospace Development Corporation =

Former State-owned aerospace and defense industry corporation of the Philippines

- Logo of the agency
- Trade name: PADC
- Type: Government-owned and controlled corporation
- Industry: Aerospace and defense
- Founded: September 5, 1973; 53 years ago
- Defunct: May 8, 2026
- Headquarters: Pasay, Metro Manila, Philippines
- Area served: Philippines
- Key people: Raymond L. Mitra, President and CEO
- Parent: Department of National Defense
- Website: padc.com.ph

The Philippine Aerospace Development Corporation (PADC; Filipino: Korporasyon sa Pagpapaunlad ng Himpapawid ng Pilipinas) was a state-owned aerospace and defense technological development corporation integrated to the Department of National Defense through Executive Order No. 78, s. 2019. In 2021, PADC was under organizational realignment with the Philippine Department of National Defense's and National Security Council's highly classified plans and programs, including but not limited to its vital functions under Presidential Decree No. 415 and amended by Presidential Decree No. 1081.

PADC operated a joint venture with Airbus known as Airbus Helicopters Philippines.

== History ==
The corporation was established on September 5, 1973, by the virtue of Presidential Decree No. 286, which was issued by then-President Ferdinand Marcos. The decree served as the charter of the corporation was revised through Presidential Decree No. 696 issued by Marcos on May 9, 1975.

The mandate of the firm is to establish a "reliable aviation and aerospace industry" in the Philippines, design, manufacture and sell "all forms" of aircraft, as well as to develop indigenous capabilities in the maintenance, repair, and modification of aviation equipment.

It attempted to develop local aircraft such as the PADC Hummingbird helicopter and the PADC Defiant single-engine trainer in the 1980s but the programs were scrapped due to licensing issues and lack of government support with problem of legal issues on intellectual property rights.

Following a meeting of the Governance Commission for GOCCs in late 2017, the option of abolishing PADC was floated. Those present in the meeting citing that the PADC had failed its mandate particularly in successfully designing a plane for the last 45 years.

Then-PADC director, Rene Abad, called for the PADC's ‘revitalization’ instead, to contribute to the country's development and security in 2018.

On May 16, 2022, PADC signed a MOU with HAL to potentially acquire the Prachand [LCH], LUH and the Tejas [Light Combat Aircraft].

On November 7, 2022, House Bill 3622 was passed in the Senate, which called for extending PADC. On March 21, 2023, Senator Imee Marcos filed Senate Bill No. 2033, which is pending in the Senate as of 2025. It called for the extension of the PADC by 50 years.

On May 19, 2025, it was reported that the PADC was closed for failing to design/manufacture indigenous aircraft in the Philippines with its corporate existence expired on May 8, 2025 after the effectivity of Presidential Decree (PD) No. 696. There was consideration for PADC to be transferred to the Department of Transportation, and for Pres. Marcos to extend the corporate life through an Executive Order.

== Products ==
=== Licensed Production/Assembly ===
- MBB Bo 105 – 44 Units produced 1977-1997
- Britten-Norman BN-2 Islander – 67 units produced 1975-1995
- SIAI-Marchetti SF.260 – 18 units produced 2010-2011
- SIAI-Marchetti S.211 – 25 aircraft delivered, including one partially completed airframe for spare parts and 15 assembled locally units produced 1989-1991
- Lancair ES – 6 units 2010-2012
- Lancair IV – 2 units 2010-2012

=== Prototypes ===
- PADC Defiant 300
- PADC Hummingbird

== Presidents of PADC ==
- Capt. Roberto H. Lim
- Panfilo Villaruel (1996-98)
- Roberto R. Navida (2006 - 2007)
- Danilo Reyes Crisologo
- Antonio Buendia
- Gilbert S. Rueras (2015-2019)
- Raymond L. Mitra
