= Futura International Airways =

Spanish airline

IATA	ICAO	Call sign
FH	FUA	FUTURA
- Founded: 1989
- Ceased operations: 7 September 2008
- Hubs: Palma de Mallorca Airport
- Fleet size: 27
- Destinations: 146
- Headquarters: Palma de Mallorca, Spain
- Website: www.futura.aero

Futura International Airways was an airline with its head office in the Zona Facturación on the property of Palma de Mallorca Airport in Palma de Mallorca, Spain. It operated scheduled services and charter flights for tour operators and other airlines, in Europe, as well as wet lease and ad hoc charters. Its main base was Palma de Mallorca Airport. After failing to re-finance itself the company ceased trading on the 8 September 2008, leaving many passengers stranded in and around Spain.

== History ==
The airline was established in 1989 by Aer Lingus, Belton Air and Banco Santander, starting operations on 17 February 1990 with a flight from Palma de Mallorca to Manchester. During the 1990s, the airline expanded to cover the whole of Europe, including the Canary Islands in the South and Scandinavia and Iceland in the North, with charter flights, ad hoc charters, third party short-medium-long term operations (wet-lease) and ACMI. Under the leadership of CEO Roman Pané , it used to operate its own scheduled flights and ad hoc flights on behalf of various tour operators and airlines in Europe, North and South America, Africa and Southeast Asia. Futura operated from five permanent bases: Palma de Mallorca, Tenerife, Málaga, Gran Canaria and Dublin; as well as various other seasonal bases throughout the year. (Source: ).

The airline was later owned by Corpfin Capital (65%), Aer Lingus (20%) and management and employees (15%). On 16 October 2007, Corpfin Capital and Aer Lingus sold their stakes, during the process of a secondary buyout instigated by the present management team, making way for the participation of the investment fund Hutton Collins, so that the resulting shareholdings were as follows: the Futura Group (management and employees) had 53.5% and Hutton Collins owned 46.5%. The airline had 1,211 employees (at May 2008). It wholly owned cargo subsidiary Flyant (officially Servicios Aéreos Integrales S.A.) and Dublin-based Irish charter airline Futura Gael.

In 2008, a few months prior to its demise, in order to reduce the cost base structure, Futura relaunched Flyant as a new passenger carrier with a class-1 AOC, while continuing freighter operations as well under the Flyant name as well. Flyant (passenger carrier) took over some Futura operations, wet leasing a Boeing 737-300 and a 737-400 to Air Algerie, both aircraft and crew were based in Algiers. Futura also set up and operated a successful turn-key airline setting up and management consultancy and offered its services and on the ground aircraft maintenance services as well to several air carriers across continents, one example being Aerolínea Principal in Chile.

The airline abruptly ceased operations at 00:00 on September 8, 2008, due to a lack of cash (with debts of around €50 million). Its AOC was revoked by the Spanish Aviation Authority two weeks later after the airline was unable to show a viability plan. Since then, its grounded fleet was gradually returned to lessors.

Flyant, which also ceased operations initially alongside parent Futura, later continued in the cargo business, having been sold for the symbolic amount of one Euro, to New Iberital, a Catalan logistics group, which later renamed it Saicus Air. Flyant/Saicus Air continued operating a reduced fleet of a single Boeing 737-300, although eventually this other airline also ceased operations on 14 December 2008. : An attempt was made to restart passenger operations under Saicus Air using MD-83 aircraft however, that also was unsuccessful.

== Subsidiaries ==
Futura Gael - An Irish-based wholly owned subsidiary set up in 2007 to begin charter flights from Ireland to other EU destinations.

Flyant (Servicios Aéreos Integrales S.A)
Futura Formación TRTO
Futura Mantenimiento

== Destinations ==
=== Domestic ===
- Alicante
- Almería
- Barcelona
- Bilbao
- Fuerteventura
- Girona
- Granada
- Gran Canaria
- Ibiza
- Jerez de la Frontera
- La Palma
- Lanzarote
- Madrid
- Málaga
- Menorca
- Oviedo
- Palma de Mallorca
- Pamplona
- Reus
- Santander
- Santiago de Compostela
- Seville
- Tenerife North Airport
- Tenerife South Airport
- Valencia
- Valladolid
- Vitoria-Gasteiz
- Zaragoza

=== International ===
- Aberdeen
- Abu Dhabi
- Algiers
- Amman
- Amsterdam
- Antalya
- Athens
- Basel/Mulhouse
- Banjul
- Belfast
- Bergamo
- Bergen
- Berlin
- Billund
- Birmingham
- Bodø
- Bologna
- Bournemouth
- Bremen
- Brno
- Brussels
- Bucharest
- Budapest
- Cairo
- Cardiff
- Catania
- City of Derry Airport
- Cologne
- Copenhagen
- Corfu
- Cork
- Djerba
- Dresden
- Dubai
- Dublin
- Düsseldorf
- East Midlands
- Edinburgh
- Enfidha
- Exeter
- Faro
- Frankfurt
- Freetown
- Glasgow
- Gothenburg
- Graz
- Hamburg
- Hanover
- Helsinki
- Humberside
- Iraklion
- Istanbul
- Jönköping
- Kalmar
- Katowice
- Kazan
- Keflavík
- Klagenfurt
- Knock
- Kos
- Kristiansand
- Kyiv
- Leeds/Bradford
- Leipzig
- Liège
- Lille
- Linz
- Lisbon
- Liverpool
- London
- Luton
- Luxor
- Lyon
- Madeira
- Malmö
- Manchester
- Marseille
- Marrakesh
- Metz
- Milan
- Minsk
- Moscow
- Munich
- Murmansk
- Nantes
- Naples
- Newcastle upon Tyne
- Norrköping
- Nuremberg
- Örebro
- Oslo
- Ostrava
- Palermo
- Paris
- Porto
- Poznań
- Prague
- Prestwick
- Rhodes
- Rome
- Rostov-on-Don
- Saint Petersburg
- Salzburg
- Sandefjord
- Shannon
- Stansted
- Stavanger
- Strasbourg
- Stockholm
- Stuttgart
- Tallinn
- Tangier
- Tel Aviv
- Teesside
- Toulouse
- Treviso
- Trieste
- Tromsø
- Trondheim
- Tunis
- Turin
- Venice
- Verona
- Vienna
- Warsaw
- Yekaterinburg
- Zagreb
- Zakynthos
- Zurich

== Livery ==
Futura's aircraft were painted in white through the fuselage area, with the name Futura in blue over the front passenger windows. The tails carried Futura's logo and were painted blue.

== Fleet ==
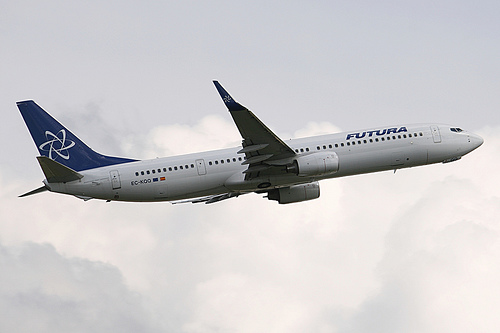
Futura Boeing 737-900

As of 4 September 2008, the Futura International Airways fleet consisted of the following aircraft:

Aircraft	#	Seats	Notes
Boeing 737-300	2	146	one aircraft was operated by Aerolínea Principal
Boeing 737-400	11	170	one aircraft was operated by Aerolínea Principal, one aircraft was operated for Blue Panorama Airlines, two aircraft were operated for Jetairfly, one aircraft was operated for Air Algérie, one aircraft was operated for Binter Canarias and one aircraft was operated for Blue Air
Boeing 737-800	12	189	one aircraft was operated for SunExpress, one aircraft was operated for JetX Airlines and one aircraft was operated for Jetairfly
Boeing 737-900ER	2		which were operated for Arkefly
