= Specair =

Flight Inspections and Systems (Specair, Russian Летные проверки и системы)
IATA	ICAO	Call sign
—	LTS	SPECAIR
- Hubs: Moscow, Russia
- Fleet size: Undeclared
- Destinations: N/A
- Headquarters: Moscow, Russia
- Website: https://www.lps-aero.com/

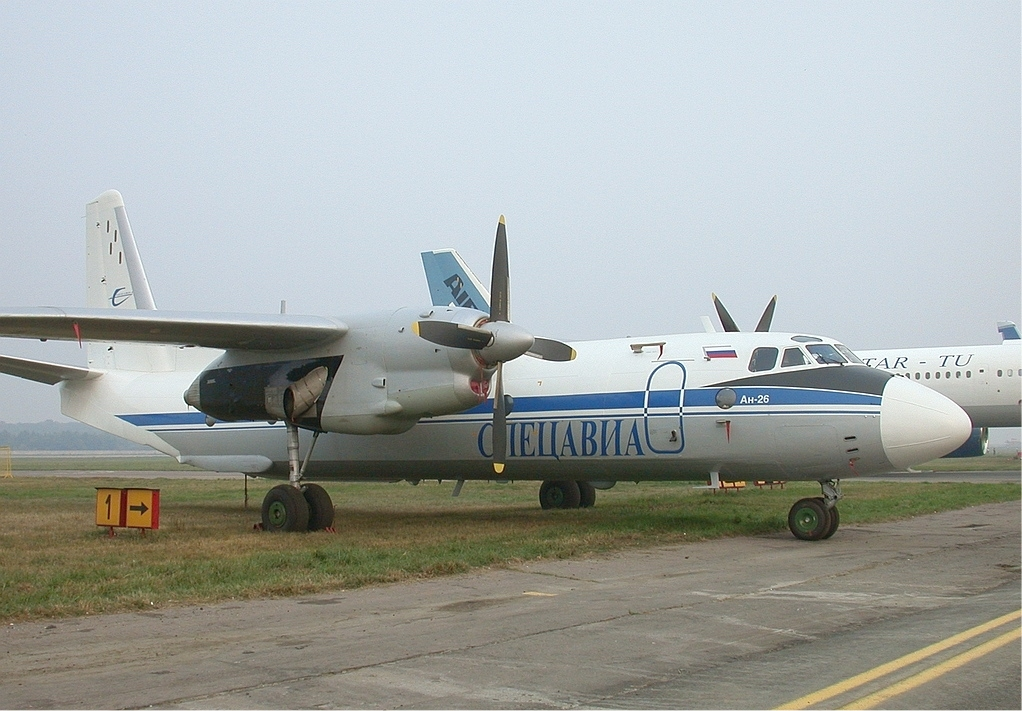
Antonov An-26

Specair is a specialist airline which carries out testing and calibration of flight equipment as well as search-and-rescue missions and aircraft maintenance.

== Fleet ==
Aircraft type	Active	Notes
Antonov An-24B	Undeclared	
Antonov An-26	Undeclared	
