= PADC Hummingbird =

Hummingbird RPX-100 ALPHA
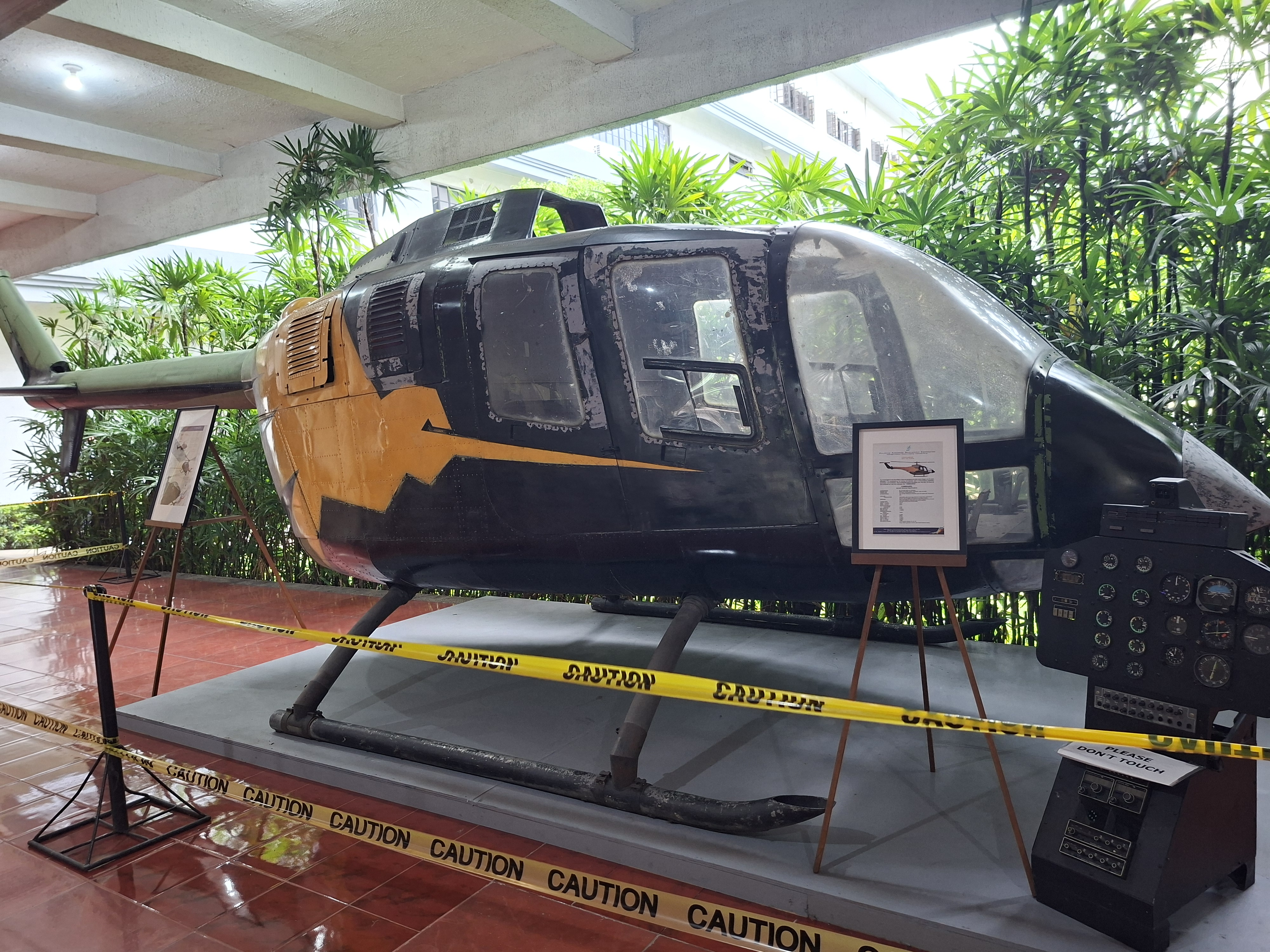
- The Hummingbird RPX-100 ALPHA is displayed at the lobby of PATTS College of Aeronautics.

General information
- Type: Light utility helicopter
- National origin: Philippines
- Manufacturer: Philippine Aerospace Development Corporation
- Status: Cancelled
- Primary user: Philippine Air Force
- Number built: 1 prototype

History
- First flight: 8 May 1998 (11:44 A.M.)
- Developed from: MBB/Eurocopter Bo 105C

The PADC Hummingbird was a light utility helicopter that was developed by the Philippine Aerospace Development Corporation to reduce dependence on second-hand aircraft for the Philippine Air Force.

== Design and development ==
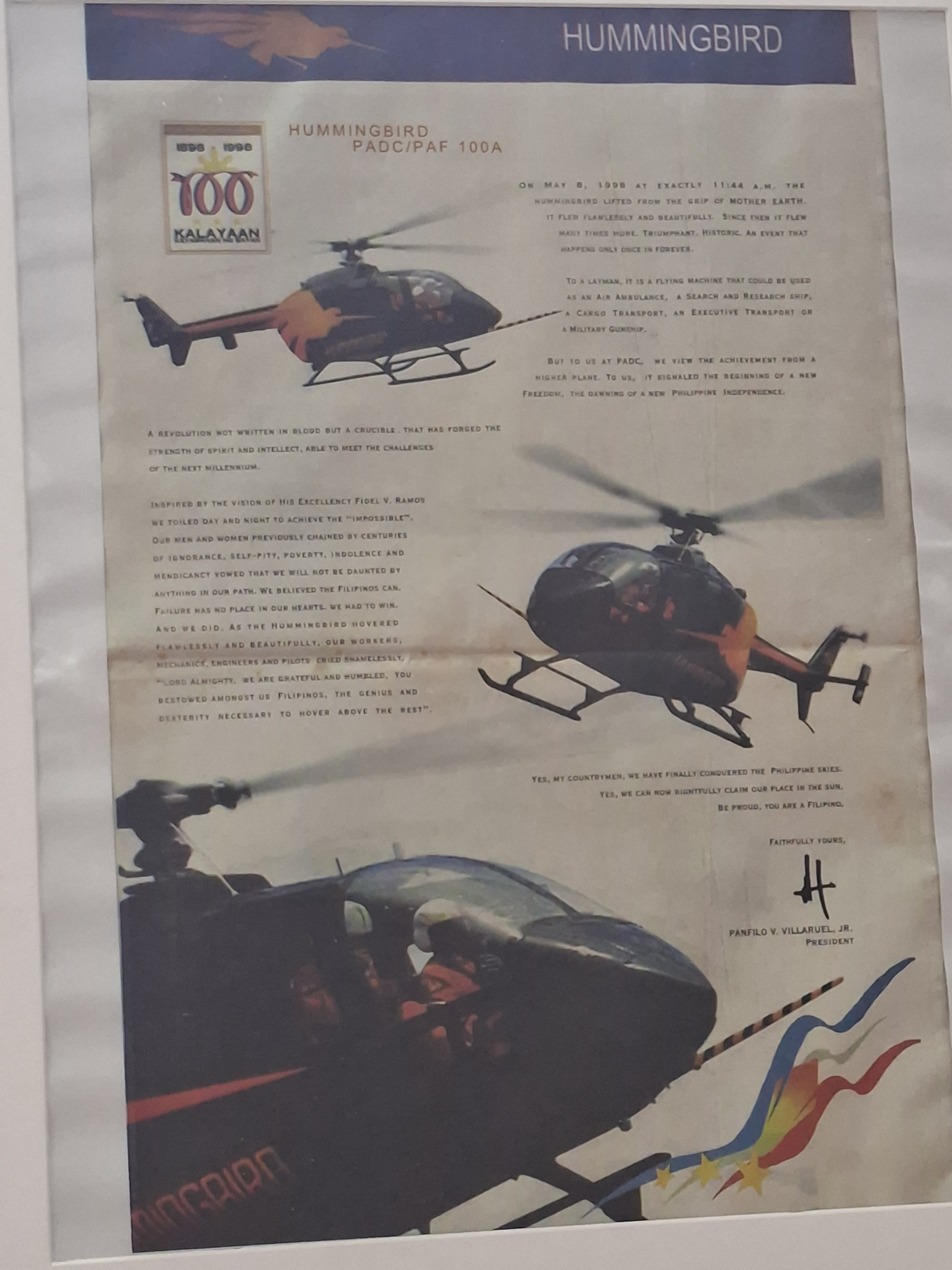
A poster signed by the PADC President Panfilo V. Villaruel, J.R for the 100 Kalayaan Celebrations that describes the Hummingbird

During the 1980s, the Philippine Air Force (PAF) wanted to reduce dependence on foreign aircraft by starting indigenous programs. This resulted in the "Hummingbird". The project was not allowed to proceed by the government until July 1997, when then-President Fidel Ramos authorized spending.

After then-President Joseph Estrada was elected, an assessment was conducted on the Hummingbird. The review concluded that the project was likely to be unjustifiably lengthy and expensive. Another factor was that the Hummingbird was an unlicensed copy of the MBB/Eurocopter Bo 105C and Eurocopter planned to raise lawsuits regarding the project.

== Variants ==
X-100A
One prototype converted from an MBB/Eurocopter Bo 105C.

== Surviving aircraft ==
- The prototype was previously stored at Ninoy Aquino International Airport.
- The prototype is now displayed at the lobby of PATTS College of Aeronautics

== See also ==
Related development

- MBB/Eurocopter Bo 105C

Aircraft of comparable role, configuration, and era

- Bell 206
- Bell 407
- Bell 427
- Eurocopter AS350 Écureuil
- MD Helicopters MD Explorer

Related lists

- List of rotorcraft
