= Saicus Air =

Spanish cargo airline

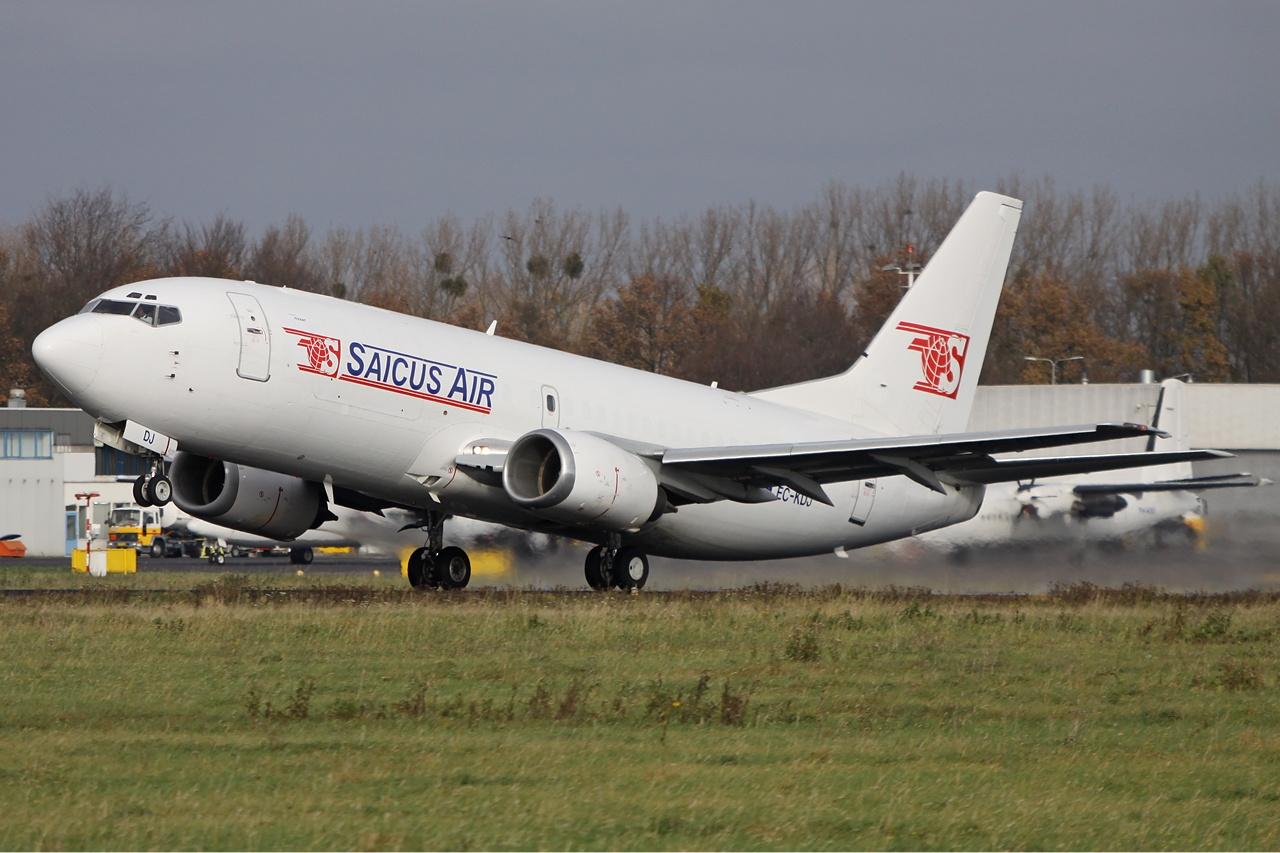
- Saicus Air Boeing 737-300SF
IATA	ICAO	Call sign
-	FYA	-
- Commenced operations: 2008
- Ceased operations: 2010
- Operating bases: Madrid Barajas Airport
- Fleet size: Fleet below
- Headquarters: Las Palmas, Spain

Saicus Air was a cargo airline based in Madrid, Spain. It took over Flyant aircraft after that airline ceased operations in 2008.

== History ==
After ceasing operations in December 2008 Flyant Cargo was sold to New Iberital, a Catalan logistics group, for the symbolic amount of one Euro. The group continued on the cargo business and named the new airline Saicus Air. Cargo operations began in October 2009, mainly covering Peninsular Spain and the Canary Islands.

In 2010 Saicus Air made an attempt to begin passenger services. It announced that it intended to acquire two McDonnell Douglas MD-87 formerly operated by Pronair. Only one of the planes, however, became part of the fleet in July 2010. In November 2010 Saicus Air announced that it would be in charge of running Bissau Airport in Guinea Bissau and that it would inaugurate twice-weekly passenger flights between Bissau, Las Palmas and Madrid. However, in the first week of December 2010—less than a month after revealing its ambitious projects—the airline ceased operations. Its MD-87 was apparently abandoned at Adolfo Suárez Madrid–Barajas Airport at that time.

== Fleet ==
- 1 Boeing 737-300F
- 1 McDonnell Douglas MD-87

== See also ==
- List of defunct airlines of Spain
