= Aquiles =

- Operating system: Microsoft Windows
- Platform: .NET
- Available in: C#
- Type: client software
- License: Apache License
- Website: aquiles.codeplex.com

Aquiles is a client for .NET (3.5 or above) to access Apache Cassandra (0.6 or above).

== Features ==
Aquiles adds following functionality:

- .NET-friendly interface to Cassandra operations.
- Byte Enconder Helpers avoid need to create and manage self-created types, like Long, UTF8, ASCII, GUID, UUID etc.
- Choose what EndpointManager to use
- Choose what Transport to use
- Configure what ConnectionPool necessary to use and its internal parameters.
- Connection pool having warm-up and size-control capabilities
- Endpoint Manager: manages all the entry-point nodes to a cluster and will automatically distribute the connections against all the cluster endpoints defined besides checking for healthiness of the nodes (defensive node health check strategy).
- Handling more than one cluster in application
- Managed (add, modify, remove) Keyspaces and ColumnFamily objects (since version 0.7.X)
- Monitors features out-of-the-box and all connections to Cassandra by the Performance Monitor (native with Windows) by implementing PerformanceCounterHelper fwk.
- Prior Keyspace and ColumnFamily existence validation against a cluster information (taken out since version 0.7.X)
- Simple and user-friendly configuration section to configure all clusters
- Validation of command parameters:
  - Input Parameter Completeness: It is no more necessary to go against a cluster to detect that parameters are missing.

== Supported commands ==
Aquiles supports all Cassandra comments and some system comments.

=== Most common commands ===
Here is the list of the most used commands:

Command	Command	Command
BatchMutateCommand	DeleteCommand	DescribeKeySpaceCommand
DescribeSnitchCommand	DescribeSplitsCommand	GetCommand
GetCountCommand	GetIndexedSlicesCommand	GetKeyRangeSliceCommand
GetSliceCommand	InsertCommand	LoginCommand
MultiGetCountCommand	MultiGetSliceCommand	RetrieveClusterNameCommand
RetrieveClusterVersionCommand	RetrieveKeySpaceDistributionCommand	RetrieveKeySpacesCommand
RetrievePartitionerCommand	TruncateColumnFamilyCommand	

=== System commands ===
Command	Command	Command
AddColumnFamilyCommand	AddKeyspaceCommand	DropColumnFamilyCommand
DropKeyspaceCommand	SchemaAgreementCommand	UpdateColumnFamilyCommand
UpdateKeyspaceCommand		

== See also ==
- Apache Cassandra
- Distributed data stores
