= Futura Gael =

Irish-based charter airline

IATA	ICAO	Call sign
F0	FGL	APPLEWOOD
- Founded: 2007
- Ceased operations: 8 September 2008
- Operating bases: Cork Airport; Dublin Airport; Shannon Airport
- Fleet size: 3
- Destinations: Various charters
- Headquarters: Dublin, Ireland
- Key people: Jaime J. Socias (CEO)

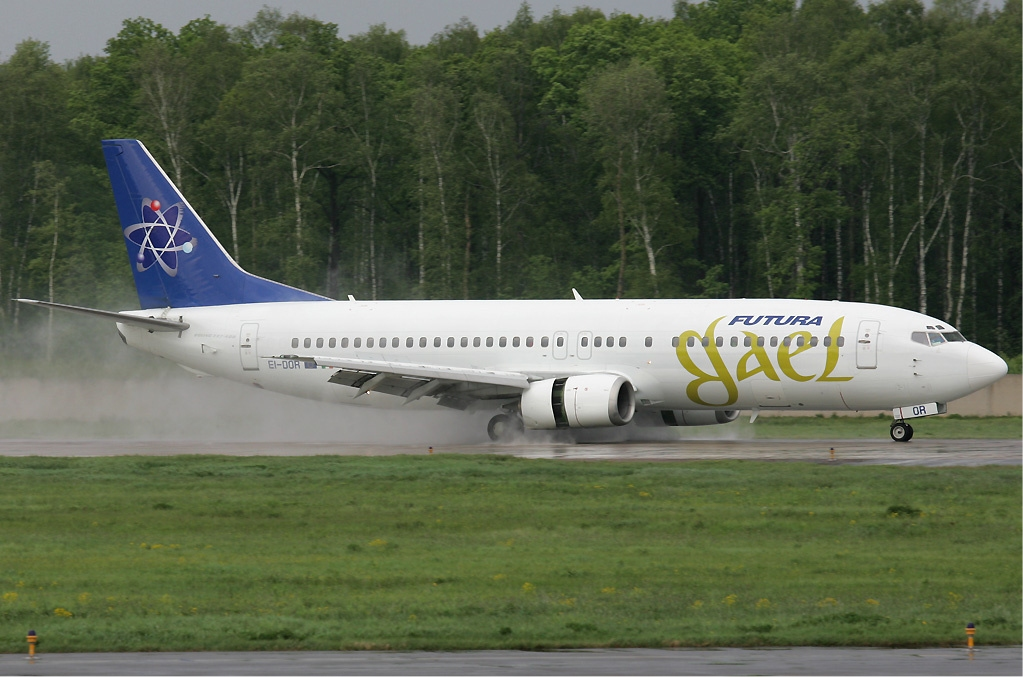
An Irish Futura Gael Boeing 737-400.

Futura Gael was an airline based in Dublin, Ireland, wholly owned by Futura International Airways, operating charter flights to Mediterranean countries, Eastern Europe and Egypt.

== History ==
Futura Gael was set up by Futura International Airways in order to get the necessary traffic rights to operate charter flights from Ireland to destinations outside the European Union. The airline operated charter flights to the Mediterranean and Eastern Europe.

In 2008, Futura Gael was reported to have planned cutbacks in staffing and wages for the following year; specifically, management suggested that all employee salaries be cut to €1000 a month.

=== Incident ===
On 7 September 2008, a Futura Gael flight bound for Málaga, Spain was delayed at Dublin Airport for nearly three hours before it finally took off just before 10 p.m. The airline officially ceased operations at midnight on the 8 September 2008.

== Livery ==
The airline's aircraft had the standard Futura livery with a decal citing "Gael" on the forward section.

== Fleet ==
The Futura Gael fleet consisted of the following aircraft (at 8 September 2008):

- 1 Boeing 737-400
- 2 Boeing 737-800
