= Flyant =

Spanish cargo airline

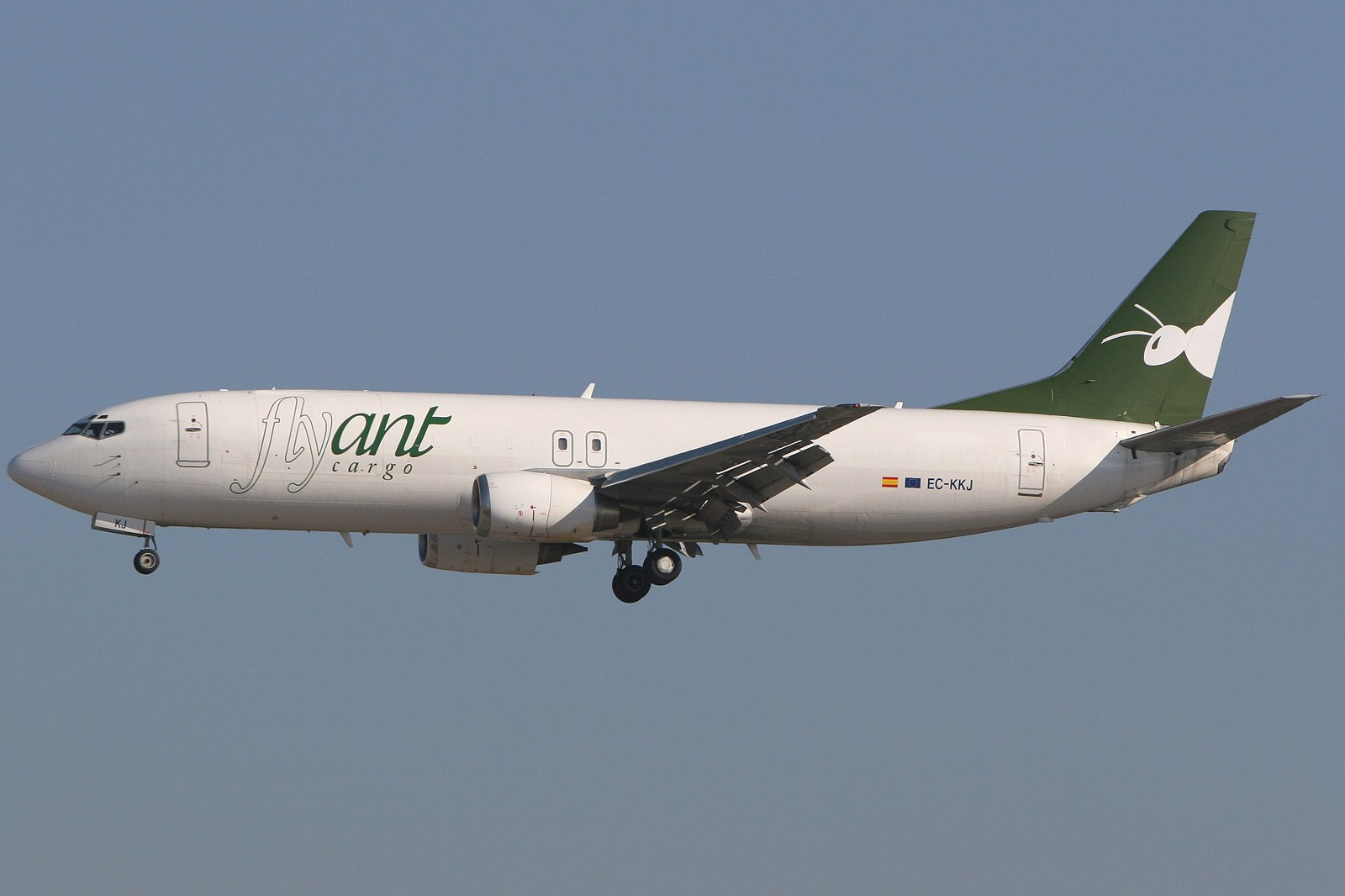
IATA	ICAO	Call sign
-	FYA	FLYANT
- Founded: 2006
- Ceased operations: 2008
- Hubs: Madrid Barajas International Airport
- Fleet size: 1
- Destinations: 7
- Parent company: Servicios Aéreos Integrales S.A
- Headquarters: Palma de Mallorca, Spain
- Website: www.flyant.es

Flyant, also known as FlyAnt Cargo, was an all-cargo airline based in Palma de Mallorca, Spain. It operated domestic scheduled services, as well as charter services and ACMI wet leases in Europe and West Africa. Its main base was Madrid Barajas International Airport.

== History ==
The airline started operations on 4 July 2006, was wholly owned by Futura International Airways and had 20 employees by March 2007. Its aircraft AOCs were transferred to AGROAR for Spanish flights, and Air One for Italian flights when Futura closed down on September 22, 2008, although eventually the airline fully ceased operations on 14 December of that year.

After ceasing operations Flyant was sold for the symbolic amount of one Euro, to New Iberital, a Catalan logistics group. The group continued on the cargo business and named the new airline Saicus Air.

== Destinations ==
Flyant's first 737 operated five weekly cargo services from Madrid to Las Palmas de Gran Canaria and Tenerife. The second one was based at Rome-Fuimiccino, performing a five weekly "Posta" service from Rome to Brescia, on behalf Air One. Flyant also operated a daily cargo flight between Lisbon and Funchal.

== Fleet ==
The Flyant fleet consisted of the following aircraft (as of 13 December 2008):

- 1 Boeing 737-300F

== See also ==
- List of defunct airlines of Spain
