= Finnhems =

Medical helicopter service in Finland

FinnHEMS Oy
- Type: Limited company (osakeyhtiö)
- Industry: Medical helicopter services
- Founded: 2010; 16 years ago
- Headquarters: Vantaa, Finland
- Area served: Finland
- Owner: Finnish Government
- Website: finnhems.fi

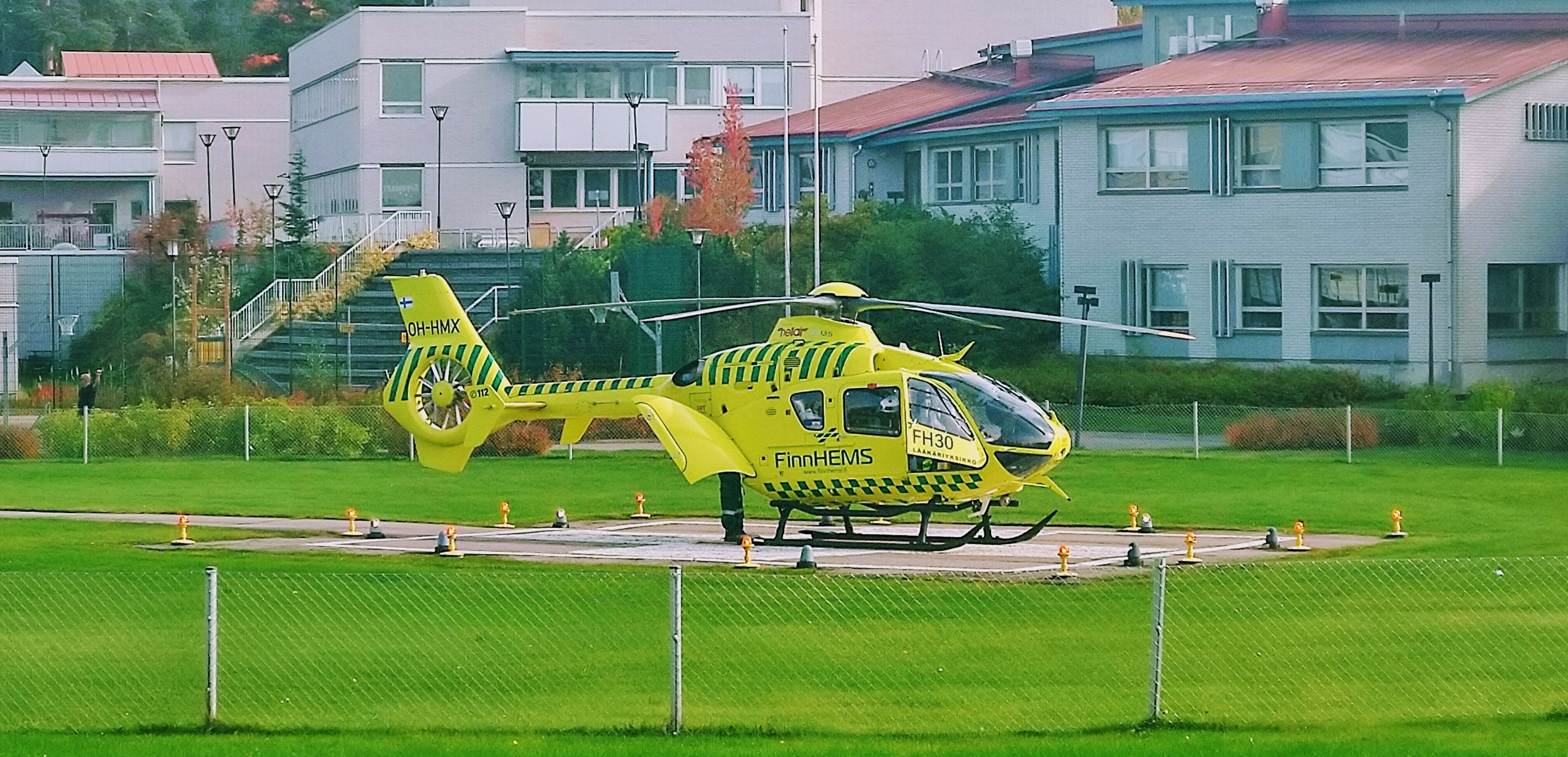
Finnhems FH30 landed at the Jorvi Hospital helipad

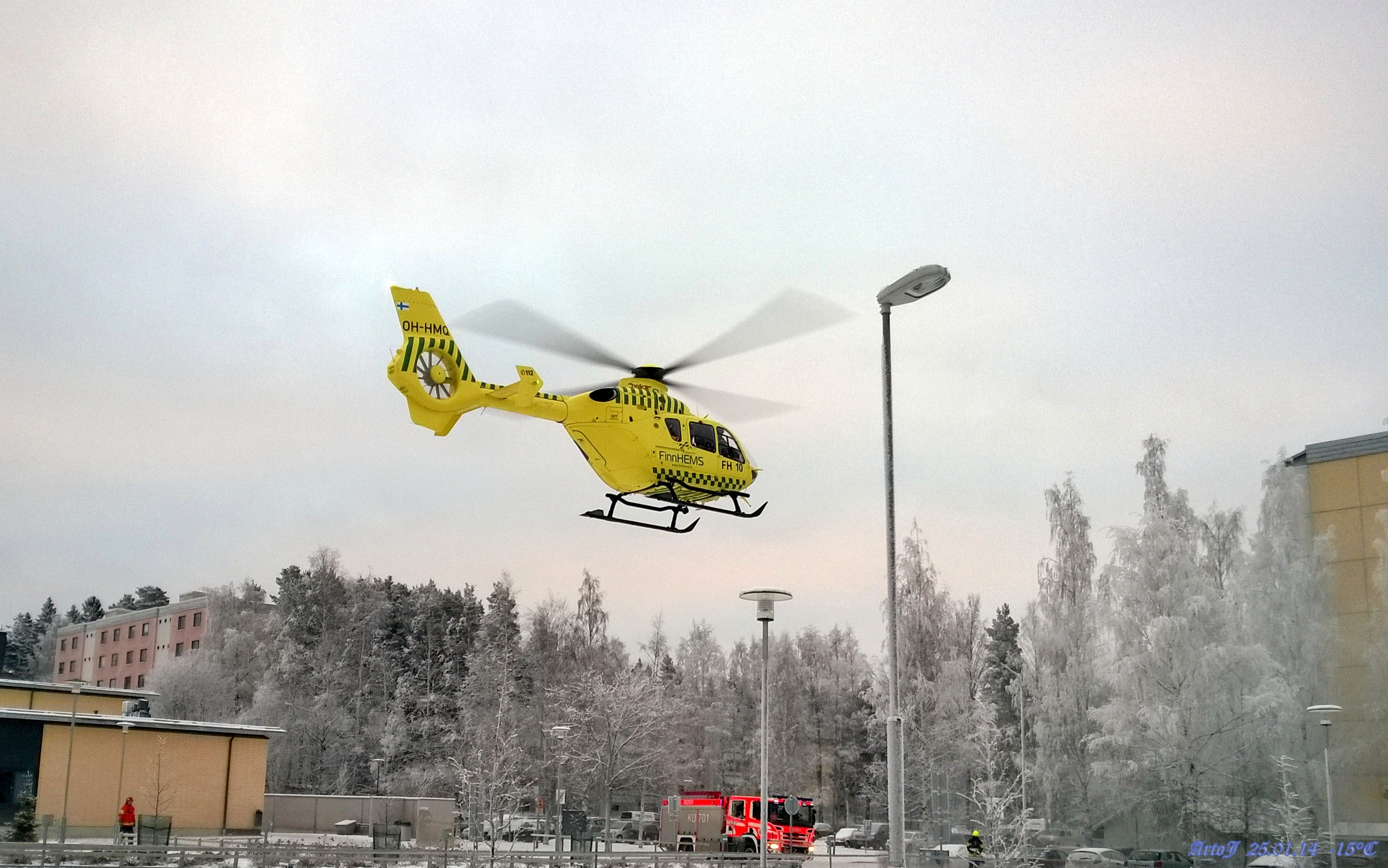
Finnhems FH10 onscene in Järvenpää

FinnHEMS Oy is a government-owned non-profit joint-stock company that manages the nationwide system of medical helicopters in Finland. Finnhems hires the helicopter companies that provide the air medical services in Finland and oversees the medical helicopter bases around the country. Currently, the helicopter companies that operate in Finland under Finnhems are Babcock Scandinavian AirAmbulance and Skärgårdshavets Helikoptertjänst that use Airbus EC 145 T2, Airbus 145 T2 and Eurocopter EC135 P2 Single Pilot IFR helicopters.

All of the medical helicopters have a medical doctor onboard except for the Rovaniemi unit which has a paramedic. Finnhems' flights rarely transport anyone to the hospital but rather bring the emergency medicine to the patient that usually gets transferred via an ambulance that has also been dispatched to the scene. To dispatch a Finnhems unit, an emergency medical dispatcher consults a doctor and makes a risk assessment on whether one is needed. The most common reasons that a unit is dispatched are cardiac arrest, unconsciousness, chest pain and traffic accidents.

Finnhems' medical helicopters and ground units are on call 24/7 around the year to ensure that intensive care level emergency medicine reaches the people of Finland on time which is critical in bad cases of medical emergencies. In 2014, the medical helicopters responded to 14,444 calls around the country.

== Bases ==
Base	Location
Helsinki-Vantaa Airport	Vantaa
Turku Airport	Turku
Rovaniemi Airport	Rovaniemi
Utti Airport	Kouvola
Kuopio Airport	Kuopio
Tampere-Pirkkala Airport	Tampere
Oulu Airport	Oulu
Seinäjoki Airport	Seinäjoki
