= Messerschmitt-Bölkow-Blohm =

Defunct West German aerospace manufacturer

- Industry: Aerospace
- Predecessor: Messerschmitt (1968); Bölkow (1968); Hamburger Flugzeugbau (1969)
- Founded: 1968; 58 years ago
- Defunct: 1989
- Fate: Acquired by and merged into DASA
- Headquarters: Ottobrunn, West Germany
- Parent: Airbus Commercial Aircraft

Messerschmitt-Bölkow-Blohm (MBB) was a West German aerospace manufacturer. It was formed during the late 1960s as the result of efforts to consolidate the West German aerospace industry; aircraft manufacturer Messerschmitt AG merged with the civil engineering and aviation firm Bölkow in 1968, while rival aircraft manufacturer Hamburger Flugzeugbau (an offshoot of Blohm & Voss shipbuilders) was acquired by the company in the following year.

The company was responsible for the development and manufacture of various aircraft during its existence. Among its best-known products were the MBB Bo 105 light twin-engine helicopter and its enlarged derivative, the MBB/Kawasaki BK 117. MBB was also a key early partner on the Airbus A300, a wide-body twin-jet airliner; the company's involvement in the A300's development and production led to it forming a key component of the multinational Airbus consortium. It was also involved in numerous experimental aircraft programmes, such as the MBB Lampyridae, an aborted stealth aircraft.

The ownership and assets of MBB changed drastically throughout its roughly two decades of existence. The company was bought by Deutsche Aerospace AG (DASA) in 1989; following several mergers and restructures, the assets of what was MBB presently form a part of Airbus.

== History ==
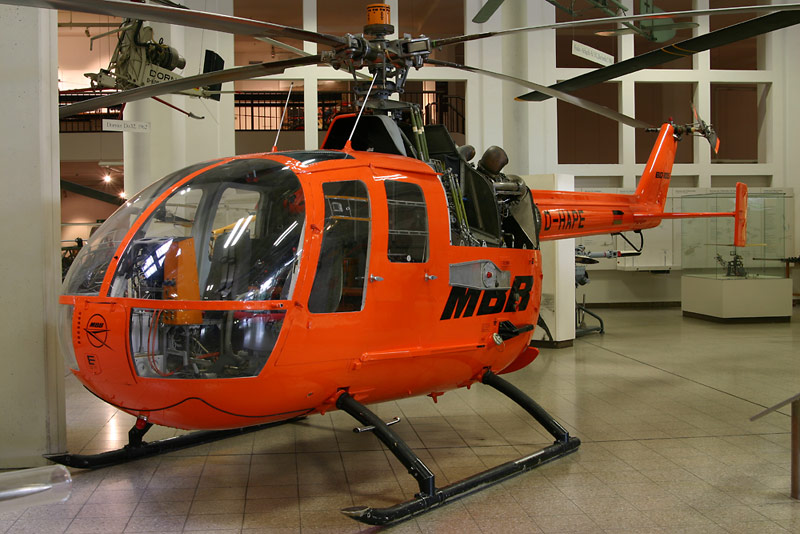
The fourth MBB Bo 105 prototype in the Deutsches Museum in Munich

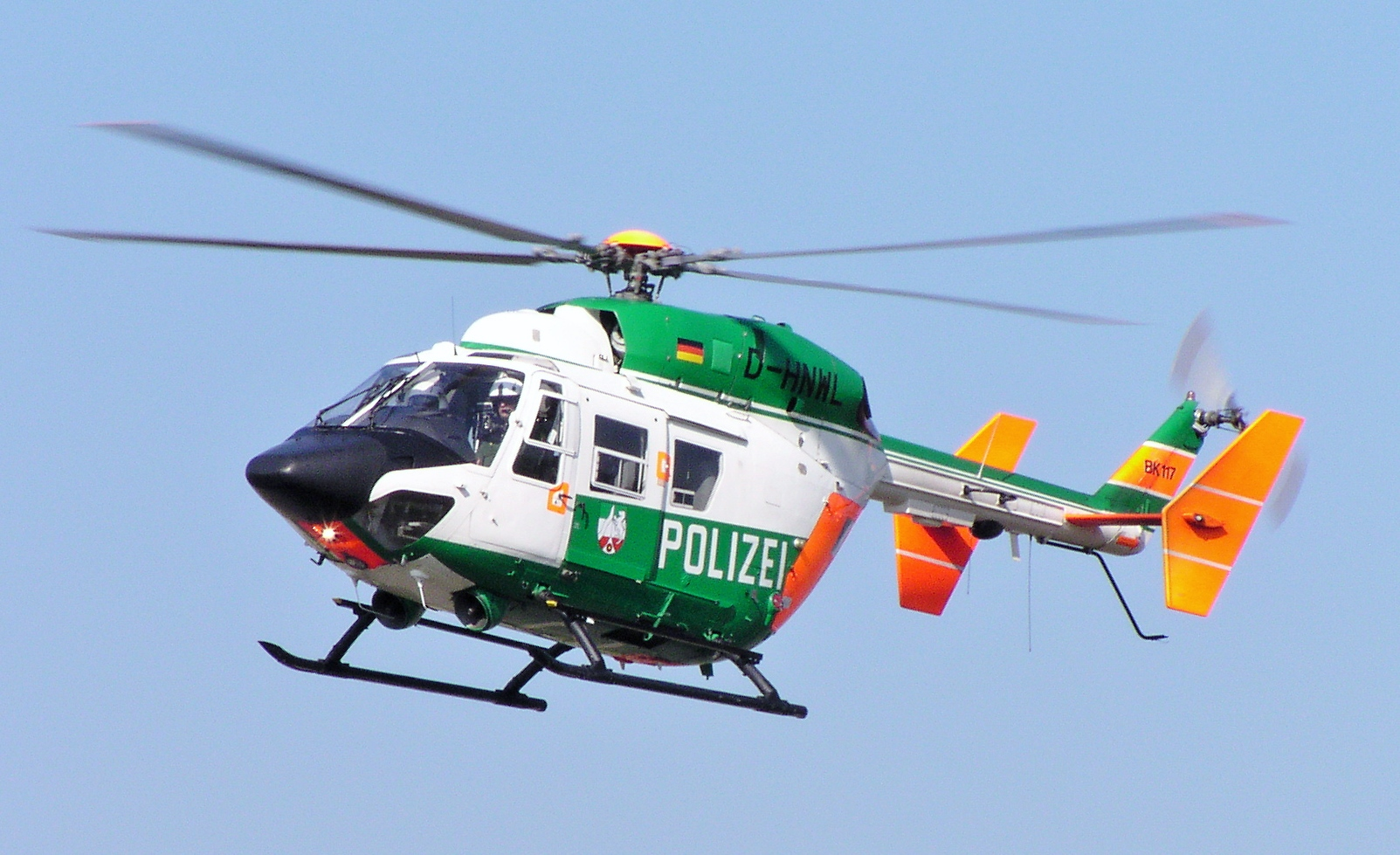
A BK 117 B2 of the German Police, in Düsseldorf, October 2005

On 6 June 1968, Messerschmitt merged with the small civil engineering and civil aviation firm Bölkow, becoming Messerschmitt-Bölkow. The following May, the firm acquired Hamburger Flugzeugbau (HFB), which had originated as a branch of Blohm+Voss. To reflect the latter's acquisition, the company changed its name to Messerschmitt-Bölkow-Blohm (MBB). Upon its formation, 51% of the shares in MBB was owned by the Blohm family, Willy Messerschmitt and Ludwig Bölkow; 22.07% was owned by the German State of Hamburg, 17.05% by the state of Bavaria, 7.16% by ThyssenKrupp, 7.16% by Siemens, 7.13% by Allianz, 7.13% by Robert Bosch GmbH and 6.15% by Krupp.

Perhaps the most successful product produced primarily by MBB was the Bo 105 helicopter. This rotorcraft, the design of which was headed by German engineer Ludwig Bölkow, made use of a revolutionary hingeless main rotor composed of fibreglass. On 13 October 1970, the German Civil Aviation Authority certified the Bo 105; initial deliveries for the first customers, ADAC Air Rescue and the Bavarian State Police, took place shortly thereafter. During 1972, an improved version of the rotorcraft with more powerful engines, the Bo 105C, was developed, this model quickly superseded the Bo 105A. Following its introduction to service in 1970, the Bo 105 quickly proved to be a commercial success. Production continued until 2001; by the end of production, 1,406 rotorcraft had been manufactured and delivered to operators in 55 nations worldwide. It served as the basis for several derivatives, such as the MBB/Kawasaki BK 117.

Having established a reputation for reliability and safety, MBB, along with one of its major shareholders, Boeing Vertol, began studying options during the 1970s for producing an enlarged version to accompany the Bo 105. However, Boeing withdrew from the venture, leading to MBB search for another partner; this was found in the form of Japanese company Kawasaki Heavy Industries. On 25 February 1977, MBB and Kawasaki signed an agreement to cooperate on the development of a new rotorcraft. Under the terms of this agreement, the two corporations merged their previously separate projects to produce twin-engined general purpose helicopters, these being the Bo 107 by MBB and the KH-7 from Kawasaki. Separate elements were assigned to each company; MBB were responsible for developing the rotors (these were based on the rigid rotor system previously used on MBB's Bo 105), tailboom, flight controls and hydraulic system while Kawasaki undertook the development of the landing gear, airframe, main transmission, electrical system and other minor components. Each company established its own final assembly line for the type, on which they produced the rotorcraft to meet demands within their respective local markets.

An even more advanced derivative of the Bo 105, initially designated by MBB as the Bo 108 began development during the 1970s. The company developed it in partnership with France's Aérospatiale; the Bo 108 was originally intended to be a technology demonstrator, combining attributes of the successful Bo 105 with new advances and an aerodynamically streamlined design. Technologies included the first full-authority digital engine controls (FADEC) on a helicopter, a hingeless main rotor, and the adoption of a new transmission. First flown on 17 October 1988, a production version was introduced as the Eurocopter EC135 during the early 1990s which, like its Bo 105 ancestor, achieved similar commercial success.

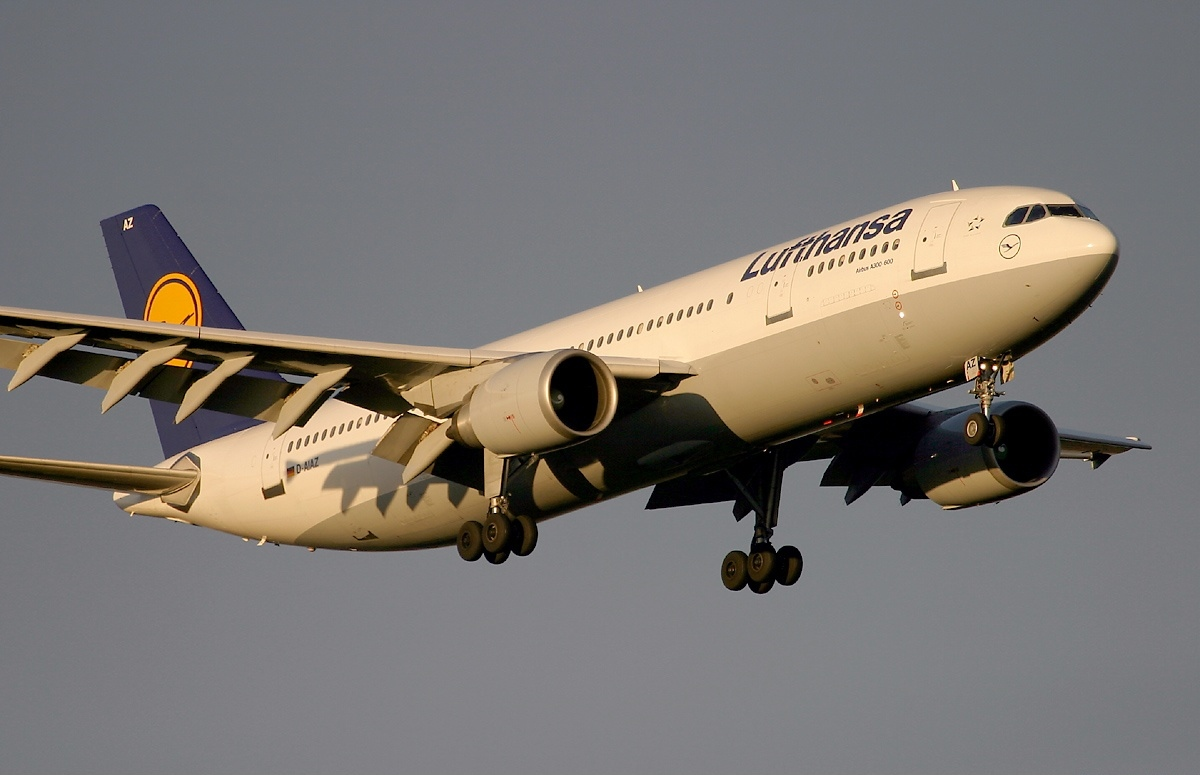
A Lufthansa A300B4-600R lands at Frankfurt Airport in 2003. Lufthansa retired its A300 fleet on 1 July 2009.

Perhaps the most important partnership that MBB was involved in was the Airbus A300. On 26 September 1967, the British, French, and West German governments signed a Memorandum of Understanding to start development of the A300. At this point, the A300 was only the second major joint aircraft programme in Europe, the first being the Anglo-French Concorde. Under the terms of the memorandum, Britain and France were each to receive a 37.5 per cent work share on the project, while Germany received a 25 per cent share. France's Sud Aviation was recognized as the lead company for A300, while Hawker Siddeley was selected as the British partner company. On 29 May 1969, during the Paris Air Show, French transport minister Jean Chamant and German economics minister Karl Schiller signed an agreement officially launching the Airbus A300, the world's first twin-engine widebody airliner. The project intended to produce an aircraft that was smaller, lighter, and more economical than its three-engine American rivals, the McDonnell Douglas DC-10 and the Lockheed L-1011 TriStar.

Shortly after the Paris Air Show agreement, it was decided that, to provide effective management of responsibilities, a Groupement d'intérêt économique would be established, allowing the various partners to work together on the project while remaining separate business entities; this would be the origins of the Airbus Group. On 18 December 1970, Airbus Industrie was formally established following an agreement between Aérospatiale (the newly merged Sud Aviation and Nord Aviation) of France and the antecedents to Deutsche Aerospace of Germany, each receiving a 50 per cent stake in the newly formed company. On 15 March 1974, type certificates were granted for the A300 from both German and French authorities, clearing the way for its entry into revenue service. Ten years after the official launch of the A300, the company had achieved a 26 per cent market share in terms of dollar value, enabling Airbus Industries to proceed with the development of its second aircraft, the Airbus A310.

During 1981, MBB acquired rival company Vereinigte Flugtechnische Werke (VFW), which itself had been formed via the merger of the aircraft manufacturers Focke-Wulf, Focke-Achgelis, and Weserflug. During the following year, MBB acquired the astronautics company Entwicklungsring Nord (ERNO; to reflect this change, the company was rebranded as MBB-ERNO. In 1989, MBB was taken over by Deutsche Aerospace (DASA), which was renamed "Daimler-Benz Aerospace" in 1995. Following the 1998 merger of the German industrial group Daimler Benz and the American company Chrysler Corporation, the aerospace division was renamed DaimlerChrysler Aerospace AG on 7 November 1998. As part of the prevailing trend of European defense consolidation of the late 1990s saw DASA being merged with Aerospatiale-Matra of France and Construcciones Aeronáuticas SA (CASA) of Spain to form the European Aeronautic Defence and Space Company (EADS) during 2000. The former assets of the DaimlerChrysler Aerospace, for the most part, presently operate as "Airbus Germany".

== Subsidiaries ==
- MBB-Liftsystems AG, which produces lifting systems for trucks and vans.
- MBB-Sondertechnik (today FHS Förder– und Hebesysteme GmbH), developed wind rotors in the 1980s and 1990s, and lifting systems for military use.
- MBB Gelma GmbH, produces timekeeping units and machine control units (today owned by DORMA KG)
- MBB Group AG

== Products ==
=== Aircraft ===
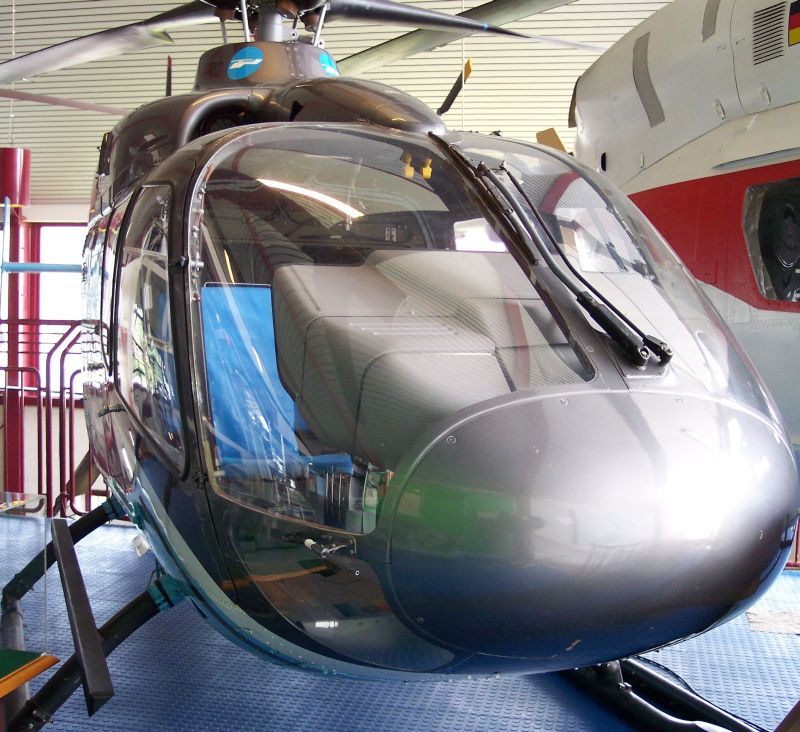
MBB Bo 108, later known as Eurocopter EC 135

- MBB Bo 102
- MBB Bo 103
- MBB Bo 105
- MBB Bo 106
- MBB Bo 108 - became the Eurocopter EC 135
- MBB Bo 115
- MBB Bo 209
- MBB/Kawasaki BK 117
- MBB 223 Flamingo
- MBB/Hamburger Flugzeugbau HFB-320 Hansa Jet

==== Prototypes, concepts and R&D ====
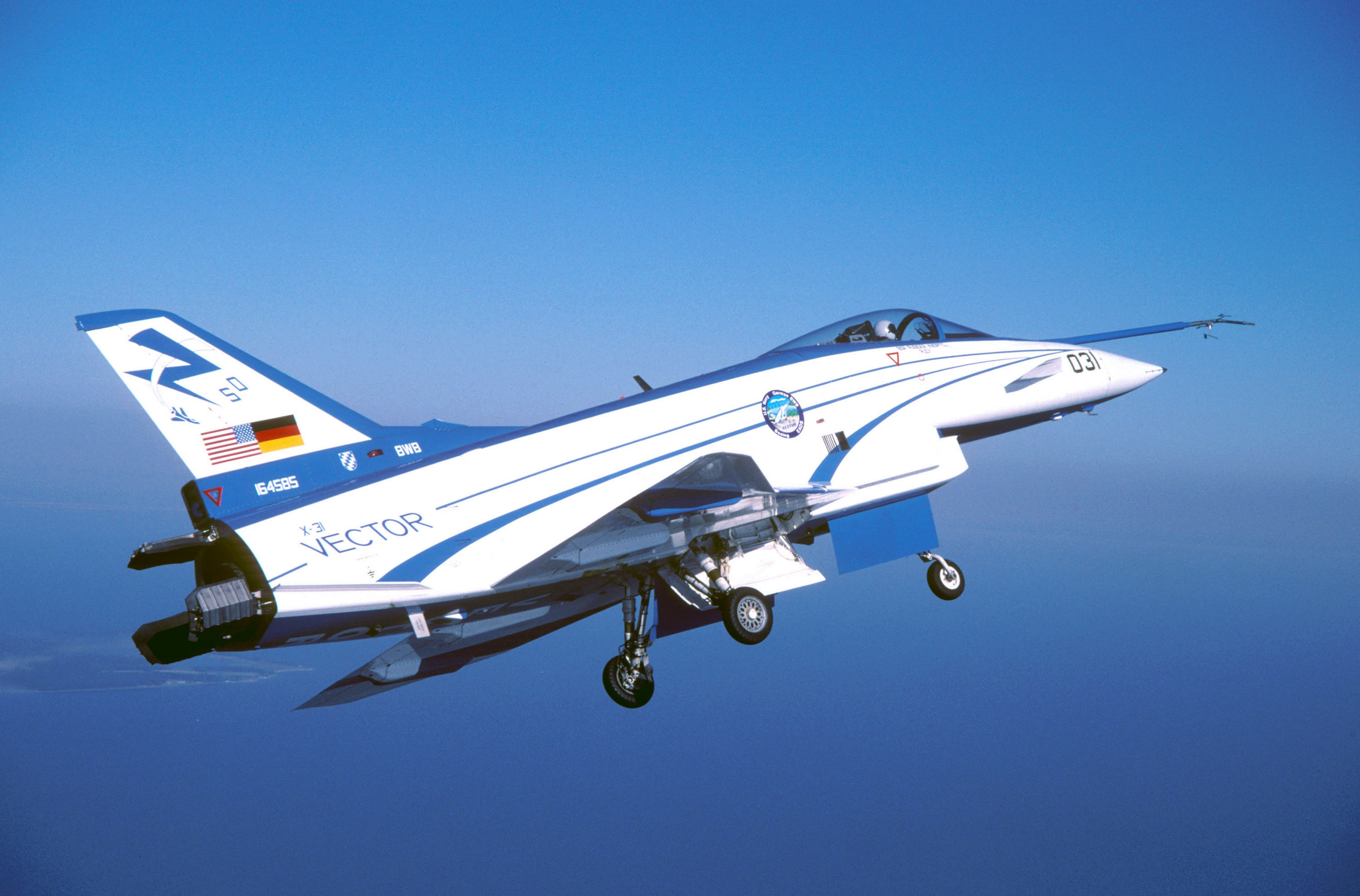
Rockwell-MBB X-31, one of two X-31 Enhanced Fighter Maneuverability Demonstrator aircraft (top)

- MBB F-104G/CCV (CCV Program)
- MBB Lampyridae
- Before merger with MBB
  - VFW VAK 191B
  - VFW SG 1262 Schwebegestell

==== Partnerships ====
- Airbus A300
- Airbus A310
- Airbus A320 family
- Eurofighter Typhoon
- EWR VJ-101
- MPC 75
- Panavia Tornado
- Rockwell-MBB X-31
- Transall C-160

=== Missiles ===
- AS.34 Kormoran
- Cobra (missile)

==== Partnerships ====
- HOT (missile)
- MILAN
- Roland (missile)

=== Space hardware ===
==== Uncrewed spacecraft ====
- Galileo (spacecraft)
- Helios (spacecraft)
- Symphonie
- EURECA
- Shuttle pallet satellite

==== Crewed spacecraft ====
- Spacelab
- Saenger (spacecraft)

=== Other ===
- MBTA Commuter Rail BTC-3 and CTC-3 rail cars
- DB Class 420 commuter trains
- DB ICE 1 high-speed trains
- Alpenflug, a suspended roller coaster
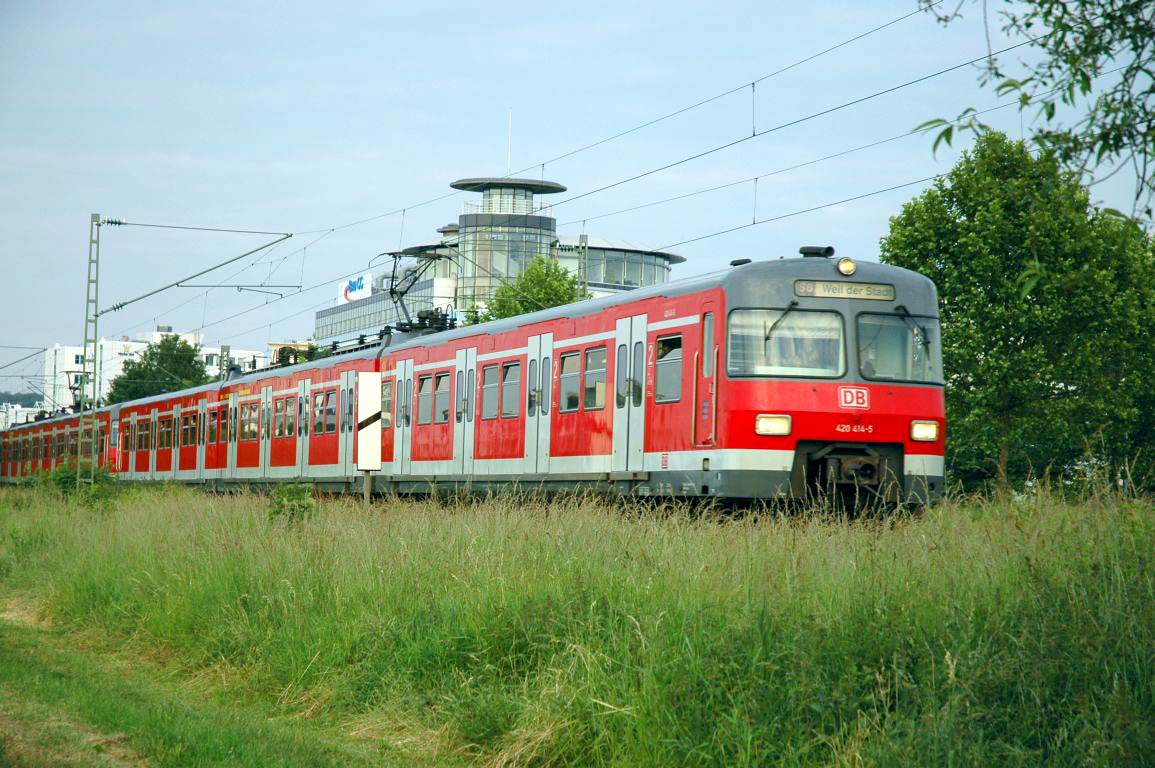
DB Class 420 commuter trainsets in Stuttgart

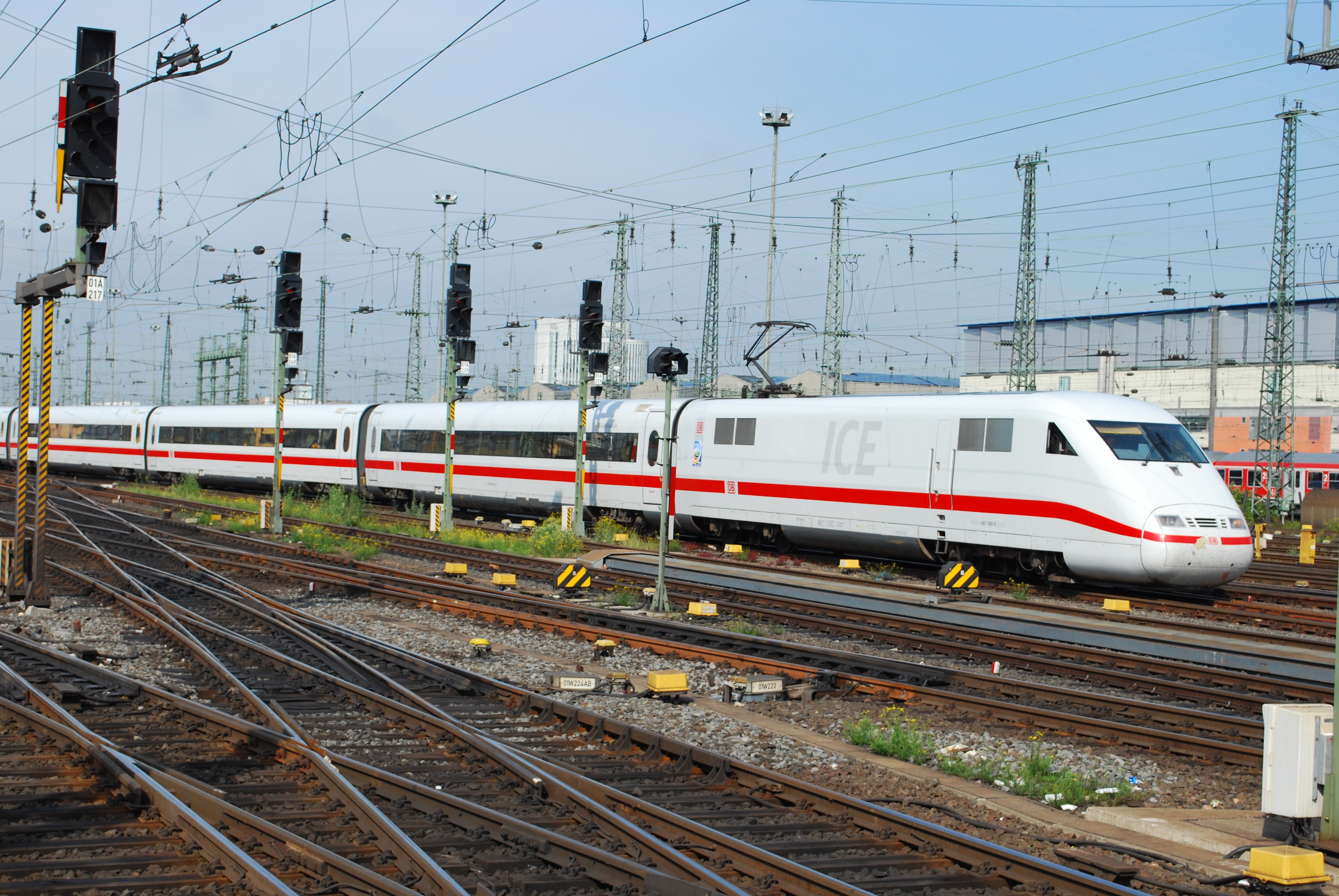
DB ICE 1 (Class 401) high-speed trainset in Munich

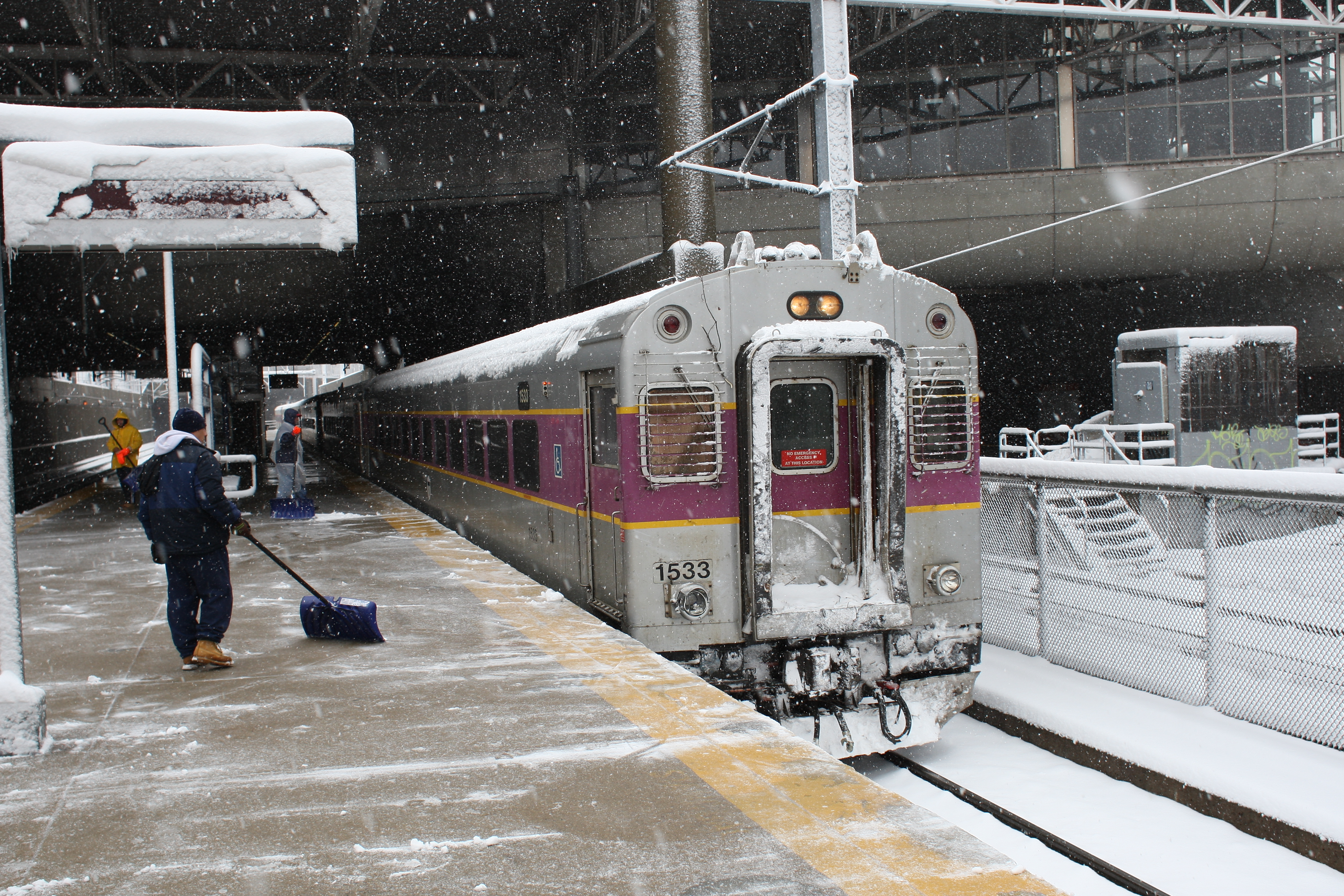
MBTA CTC-3 cab car at Ruggles station
