= Bölkow =

West German aircraft manufacturer

Bölkow was a West German aircraft manufacturer based in Stuttgart, Germany, and later Ottobrunn.

== History ==
The company was founded in 1948 by Ludwig Bölkow, who since 1955 with Emil Weiland had developed helicopters for Bölkow Entwicklungen KG. In June 1968, Bölkow merged with Messerschmitt to form Messerschmitt-Bölkow, a combination that created West Germany's largest aircraft company, with sales approaching $150 million (1968 dollars). The move was encouraged by the West German government. In May 1969, the new company merged with Hamburger Flugzeugbau (HFB), becoming Messerschmitt-Bölkow-Blohm (MBB). MBB was bought by Daimler-Benz in the early 1990s, becoming part of DASA, which became part of EADS in 2000.

== Products ==
=== Aircraft ===
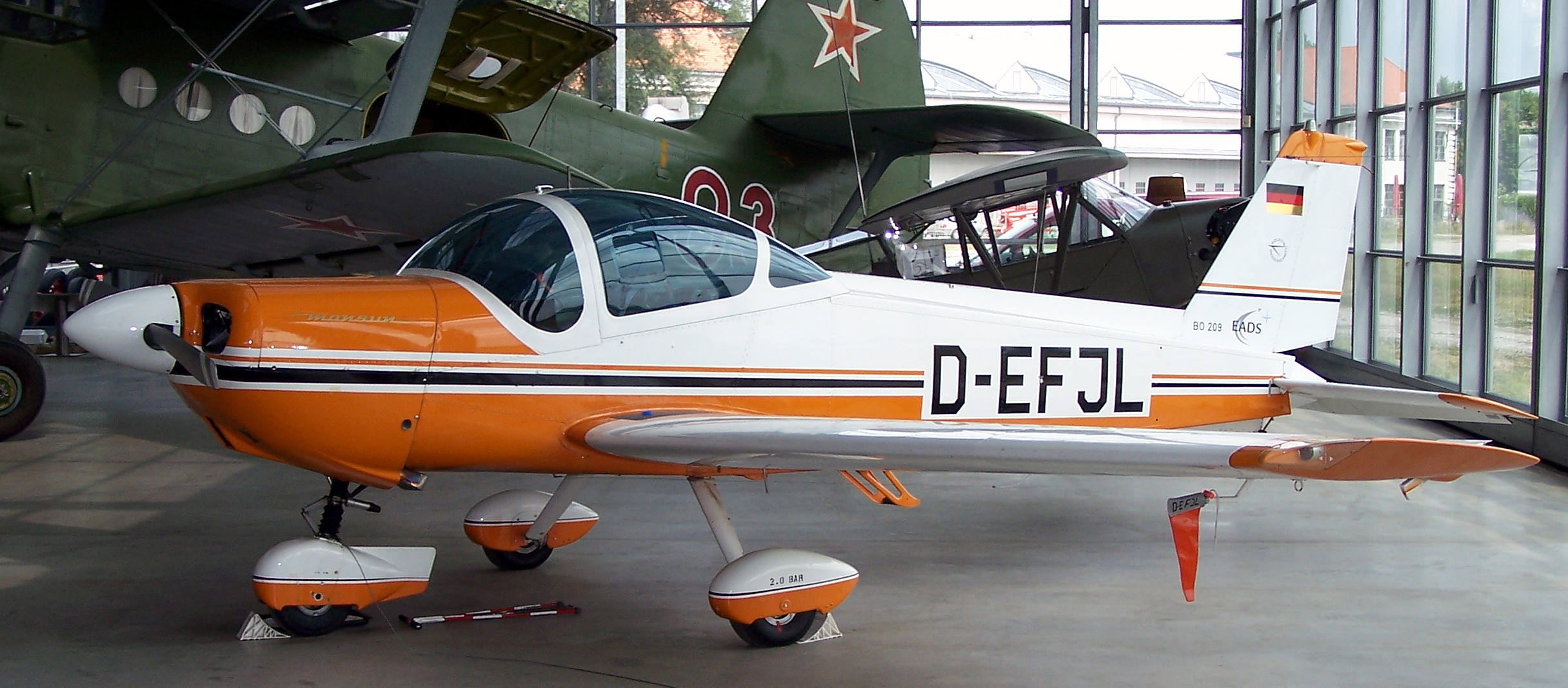
Bölkow Bo 209 Monsun, first flight 1967

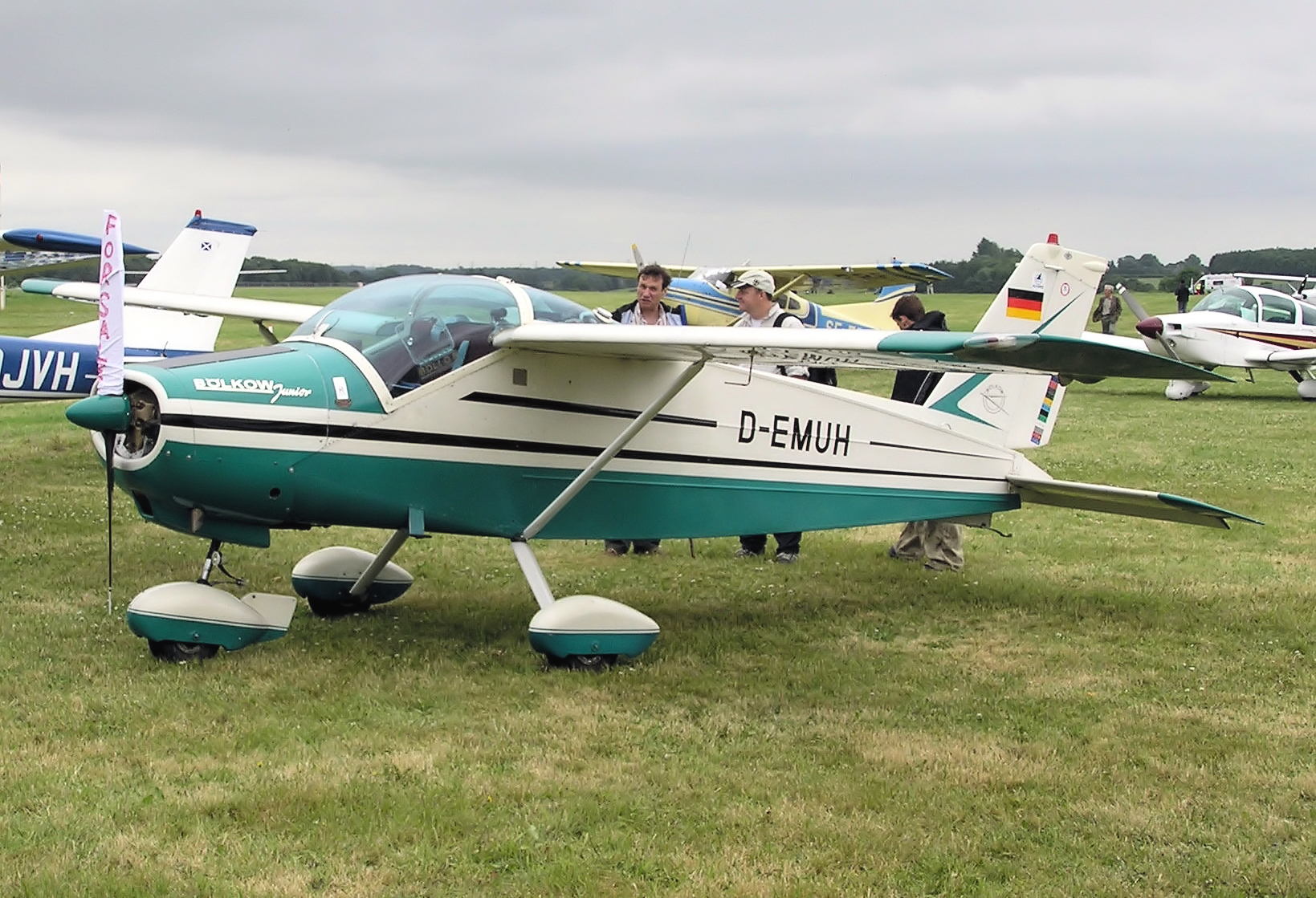
Bölkow Bo.208c Junior, built in 1966

- Bölkow Bo 207
- Bölkow Bo 208 Junior
- Bölkow Bo 209 Monsun
- Bölkow Phoebus, variants A, A1, B, B1, B3, C gliders

=== Helicopter ===
- Bölkow Bo 46
- Bölkow Heidelbergrotor experimental rotor system
- Bölkow Bo 70 Project with experimental "Heidelberg Rotor"
- Bölkow Bo 102
- Bölkow Bo 103
- MBB Bo 105
- MBB/Kawasaki BK 117 Joint project with Kawasaki

=== Missiles ===
- Cobra
- HOT
- MILAN
- Roland
