= MBB Lampyridae =

1980s German stealth aircraft

Lampyridae
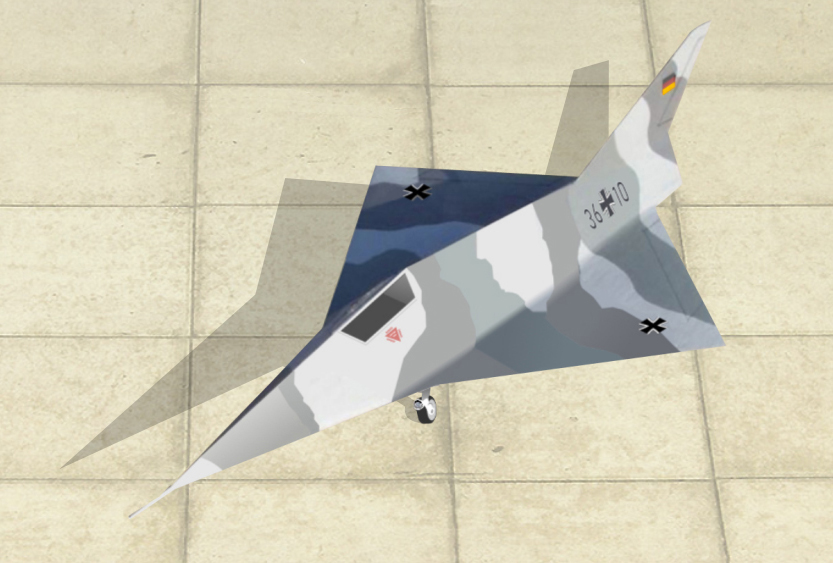
- Lampyridae concept art

General information
- Type: Stealth aircraft
- National origin: West Germany
- Manufacturer: Messerschmitt-Bölkow-Blohm
- Status: Cancelled

The MBB Lampyridae (Latin for Firefly) was a low-observable medium missile fighter (MRMF) developed during the 1980s by the West German aerospace company Messerschmitt-Bölkow-Blohm (MBB). The programme was terminated during 1987 without any production aircraft having been produced.

As early as 1975, West Germany is known to have conducted research into the field of stealth aircraft. During 1981, work commenced at MBB on developing a design for a viable stealth aircraft; the effort was supported by a contract that had been issued by the German Air Force. Also known as the Medium Range Missile Fighter (MRMF), it had been conceived that a fighter could be both lighter and cheaper if it was so superior at mid-range combat as to allow it to discard the requirement to perform close-range combat. Having been developed independently of other stealth aircraft, such as the American Lockheed Corporation's Have Blue technical demonstrator and its follow-up F-117 Nighthawk stealth attack aircraft (which at the time were still highly classified projects), the Lampyridae nonetheless used a similar approach to achieving its low-observable characteristics.

After determining the Lampyridae's design to be viable, development activity proceeded to the construction of a single three-quarter scale piloted aircraft. During 1985, wind tunnel testing of the design, including at transonic speeds commenced; two years later, a number of crewed 'flights' inside the wind tunnel were performed, during which the favourable high-quality aerodynamic properties of the design were documented. During 1987, the existence of the Lampyridae project and its design was revealed to the United States in the form of a group of United States Air Force (USAF) officers, who were shown the piloted model, which was kept in a closed-off section of MBB's manufacturing facility at Ottobrunn, Bavaria, Germany. That same year, the Lampyridae project was terminated for unspecified reasons; diplomatic pressure on the part of the US has been attributed.

== Development ==
=== Background ===
During the 1970s and 1980s, several nations, having recognised the potential strategic value of low observability, commenced research into the application of such technologies with the aim of developing viable stealth aircraft for military purposes. During this time, American aircraft manufacturer Lockheed Corporation was developing such aircraft in the form of the Have Blue technical demonstrator along with a subsequent production type in the form of the F-117 Nighthawk, a stealthy strike aircraft. Amongst the other nations working on such matters was West Germany; as early as 1975, the country had commenced its own independent research efforts into the field.

During 1981, German aerospace manufacturer Messerschmitt-Bölkow-Blohm (MBB) commenced work on its own stealth aircraft research programme. This programme, which has been mainly known by the name Lampyridae (Latin for Fireflies), or alternatively as the Medium Range Missile Fighter (MRMF), was conducted by MBB under the terms of a contract issued by the German Air Force. According to aerospace publication Flight International, the MRMF programme had been motivated by the concept that a future fighter could be both lighter and cheaper if it could be so superior at mid-range combat that it could eliminate the need to perform any close-range dogfighting-style combat. As such, MBB was required to develop an airframe which possessed a suitable configuration to achieve a forward-facing radar cross-section that would be between 20 and 30 dB (in the X band frequencies) below that of what a conventional fighter would typically achieve.

Similar to Lockheed's own approach adopted during its development of the Have Blue demonstrator aircraft and the production F-117 Nighthawk (both still classified at the time), MBB's design team harnesses the dimensional principles of an airframe externally covered by polyhedral shapes for the Lampyridae. These shapes deliberately avoid both conventional right angles and curved surfaces; lift was generated via a system of vortices produced by its sharp leading edges. This multi-faceted exterior formed the basis of the envisaged stealth fighter; according to claims by Dr Gerhard Lobert, a former project leader at MBB, the Lampyridae was highly likely to have possessed better low-observability (in terms of radar visibility) characteristics than the competing F-117 Nighthawk, despite the latter's exterior featuring more than double the number of radar-scattering facets in comparison to MBB's design.

=== Testing ===
Having developed a suitable design for such an aircraft, development activity on the Lampyridae programme proceeded to the construction of a single three-quarter scale piloted model of the aircraft. This model was initially used for a series of wind tunnel tests. Commenced during 1985, these tests are known to have involved at least two models, a 1:3.5-scale low-speed model and a 1:20-scale transonic model. According to Lobert, the results produced by the wind tunnel tests demonstrated the Lampyridae's design to have possessed favourable high-quality aerodynamic properties, despite the initial disadvantages presented by the polyhedral airframe design.

In parallel to the ongoing design work, the company also developed its own computational method for calculating an aircraft's radar cross-section. These in-house calculations have been known to have been used to compare the design of the Lampyridae with the information that was available on the American F-117 Nighthawk. Further evaluation of the aircraft's radar cross-section was performed using a full-scale model, totalling 16 meters in length.

Following the completion of preparatory work using a flight simulator, it is known that the crewed 3/4-scale model performed at least 15 individual 'flights' inside the German-Dutch wind tunnel at Emmeloord, Flevoland, the Netherlands, during 1987. In the course of these test, complete flight cycles were simulated within the tunnel's 9.5 m^{2} test section; the Lampyridae was recorded as having operated at speeds of up to 120 kn (220 km/h) and having performing various small-amplitude movements across all axes.

=== Termination and aftermath ===
The Lampyridae programme was conducted between 1981 and 1987. The reasoning behind the programme's unceremonious cancellation during 1987 is unknown, there having been no announcement on the subject made by either by MBB nor the government of West Germany at the time. Aircraft publication Aviation Week attributed alleged closed-room pressure tactics on the part of the United States, who had recently been made aware of the programme's existence and not wanting a competing stealth aircraft to their own efforts to come to fruition, as having played a key role in its termination.

During early 1995, aerospace company Daimler-Benz Aerospace (DASA), the successor to MBB, decided to release some details of the previously top-secret Lampyridae programme. Many of the specifics of the aircraft and the overall programme have remained concealed. While detailed information in regards to the Lampyridae's radar signature and its testing are considered to be classified information, however, it is known that the targets for the airframe's radar cross-section were considered to have been achieved.

Since the Lampyridae's cancellation, the German Air Force has retained interest in eventually deploying aircraft that take advantage of low-observability characteristics. In particular, it is known that the envisaged successor to the Panavia Tornado fighter-bomber is to be a yet-to-be-developed stealth aircraft (New Generation Fighter), however, it would be very likely to be developed under a multinational programme, similar to the Tornado or the Eurofighter Typhoon multirole combat aircraft.

== Follow-on ==
Using the results from the Lampyridae program, DASA decided to research on a more mature and practical stealth design called TDEFS (Technology Demonstrator for Enhancement and Future Systems). A small scale high speed wind tunnel model called FTT (Fliegender Technologie-Träger, English: Flying Technology Platform) and an uncrewed version FTTU. The aircraft was to have combined the faceted stealth technology of the Lampyridae with newly developed radar absorbent materials, but also fly-by-wire and thrust vectoring from the X-31. Some of these technologies were originally intended to be included in an upgrade of the Eurofighter Typhoon. However, the simple faceted stealth technology it made use of started to become obsolete in the 1990s, supposedly contributing to the decision to terminate the program.

== Aircraft on display ==
- During 1999, the surviving Lampyridae stealth demonstrator was placed on static display at the Militärhistorisches Museum Flugplatz Berlin-Gatow, Germany.
