= MBB/Kawasaki BK 117 =

German/Japanese utility helicopter

BK 117
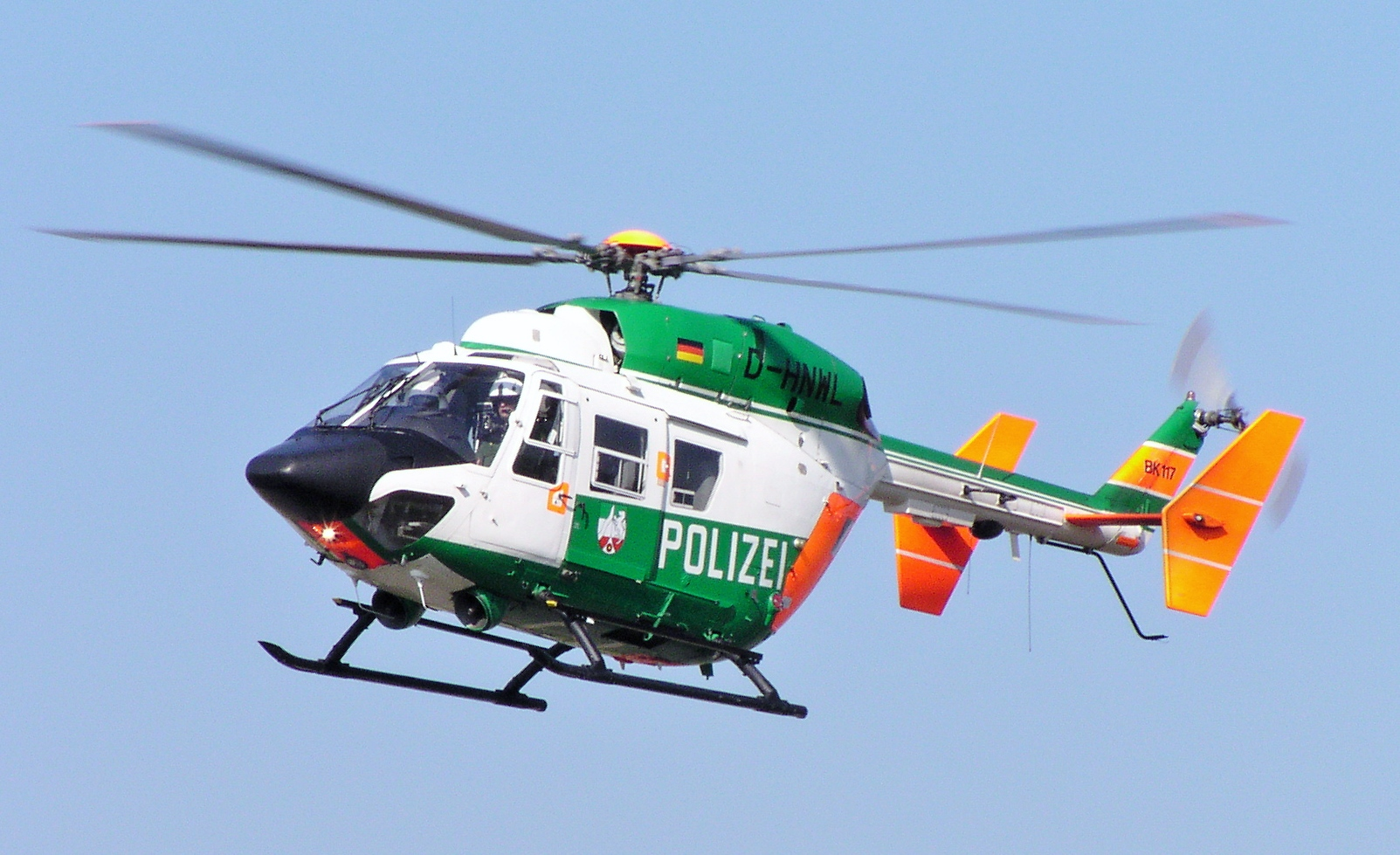
- A BK 117 of the German police

General information
- Type: Utility / transport
- National origin: West Germany / Japan
- Manufacturer: Messerschmitt-Bölkow-Blohm (MBB)/Kawasaki Heavy Industries
- Status: In production
- Primary users: DRF ADAC

History
- Manufactured: 1979–present
- Introduction date: 9 December 1982
- First flight: 13 June 1979
- Developed into: Eurocopter EC145

The MBB/Kawasaki BK 117 is a twin-engined light utility–transport helicopter. It was jointly developed and manufactured by Messerschmitt-Bölkow-Blohm (MBB) of West Germany and Kawasaki of Japan. MBB was later purchased by Daimler-Benz and eventually became a part of Eurocopter, which was later rebranded as Airbus Helicopters.

On 25 February 1977, MBB and Kawasaki signed a cooperative agreement to abandon their independent efforts to design twin-engined general purpose helicopters in favor of a collaborative venture to development of a new rotorcraft for that role. While the program's costs were shared equally, the workshare was divided into certain areas of the design. MBB utilized their expertise with the rigid rotor system used on the earlier Bo 105 to develop the majority of the dynamic systems and flight controls, while Kawasaki focused on the airframe, structural elements, and various other components. On 13 June 1979, MBB's flying prototype conducted its maiden flight at Ottobrunn, Bavaria, Germany; months later, it was followed by the Kawasaki prototype at Gifu, Chūbu region, Japan on 10 August 1979.

Each company established their own final assembly line, producing the BK 117 for their respective regions. The BK 117 has proven to be popular for passenger services and VIP-transport; the cabin can be outfitted with various seating configurations, for between seven to ten passengers. It is also used for a diverse range of other operations, such as aerial crane and sling work, law enforcement, and military transport, and is exceptional as an air ambulance and search and rescue platform. Due to its popularity, during the 1990s a refined derivative—initially marketed as the BK 117 C-2, before being rebranded as the EC145 and, yet later, the H145—was developed from the BK 117 C-1 version; this improved version of the rotorcraft has since succeeded the original BK 117 in production.

The original BK 117, Eurocopter EC145, and Airbus Helicopters H145, are typically thought of as being in one design family, despite different marketing and naming.

== Development ==
=== Origins ===
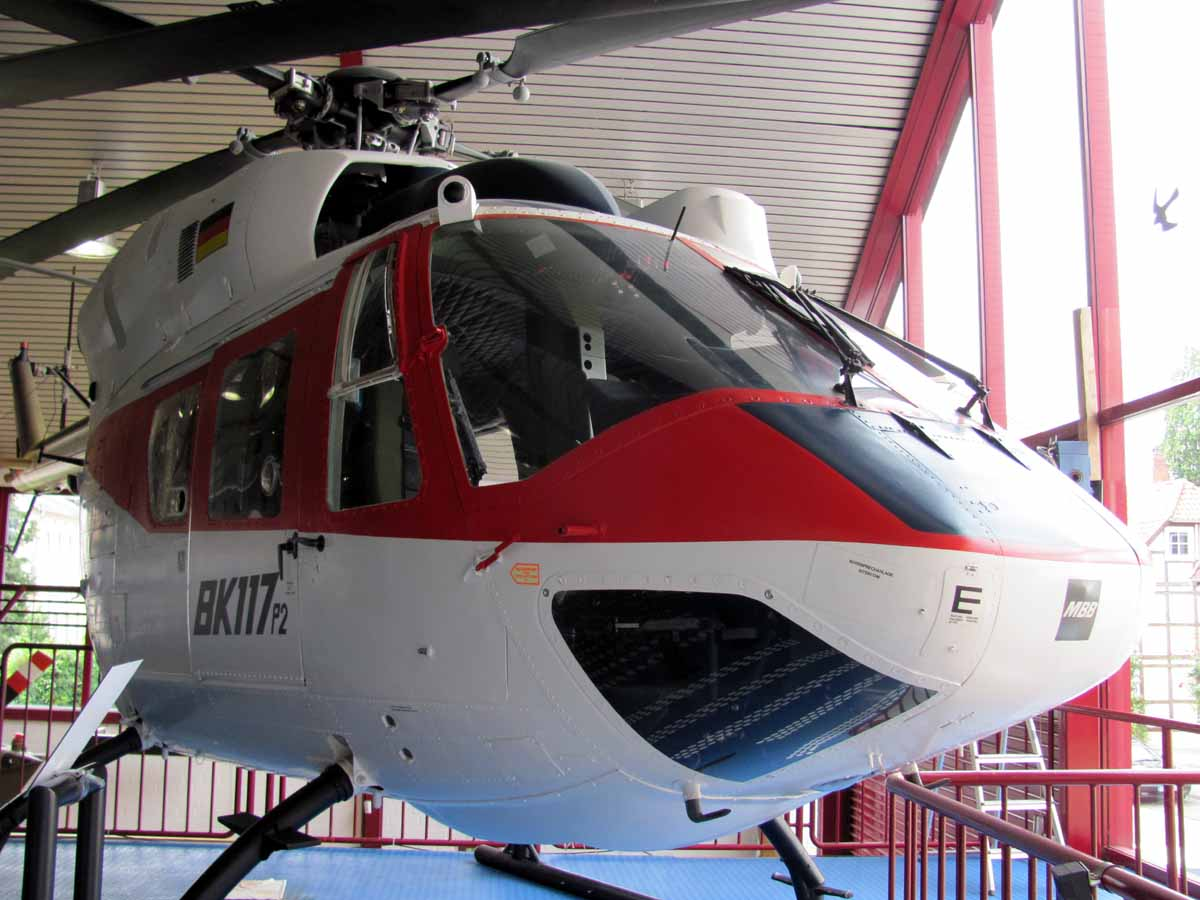
Second prototype at Hubschraubermuseum Bückeburg in Germany

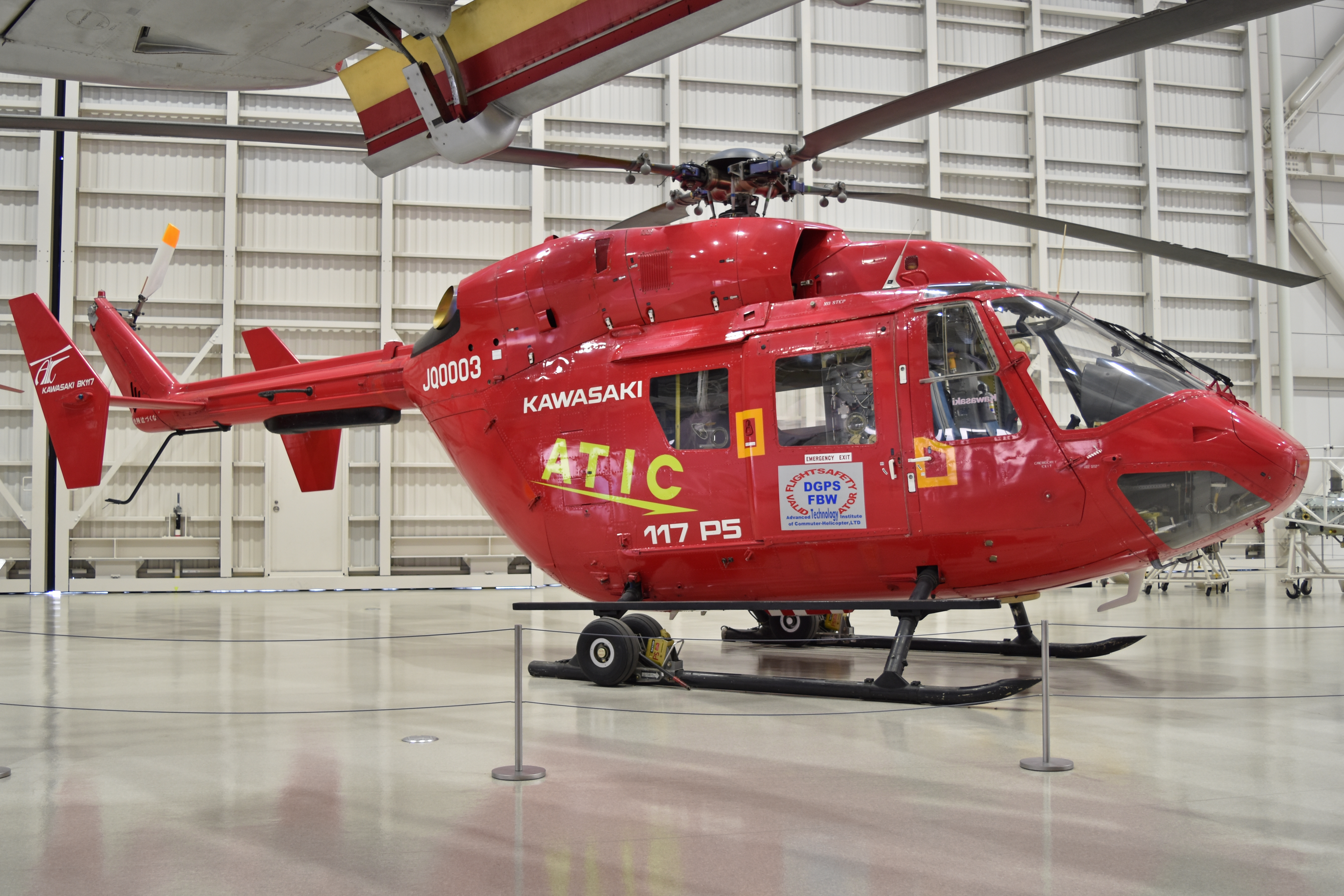
Third prototype of the BK 117, on display since 2001 in Japan

According to aviation author J. Mac. McCellan, the BK 117 has its origins in an earlier rotorcraft designed and produced by German aerospace manufacturer Messerschmitt-Bölkow-Blohm (MBB), the MBB Bo 105. This helicopter, which proved to be a commercial success, had made use of a revolutionary hingeless main rotor composed of fibreglass, which was developed by German engineer Ludwig Bölkow. Having established a reputation for reliability and safety, during the early 1970s MBB, along with one of its major shareholders, Boeing Vertol, began studying options for producing an enlarged derivative of the type to accompany the Bo 105. However, Boeing soon withdrew from the venture, leading to MBB searching for another partner; this was found in the form of Japanese company Kawasaki Heavy Industries.

On 25 February 1977, MBB and Kawasaki signed an agreement to cooperate on the development of a new rotorcraft. Under the terms of this agreement, the two corporations merged their previously separate projects to produce twin-engined general purpose helicopters, these being the Bo 107 by MBB and the KH-7 from Kawasaki. All of the privately incurred development costs were shared equally between the two partners; in November 1977, the program received a huge boost when the government of West Germany announced that it would fund half of the costs of development. By April 1978, project definition studies had been completed, enabling the joint venture to proceed with the detail design phase of development.

Separate elements of the design were assigned to each company; MBB were responsible for developing the rotors (these were based on the rigid rotor system previously used on MBB's Bo 105), tail boom, flight controls and hydraulic system while Kawasaki undertook the development of the landing gear, airframe, main transmission, electrical system and other minor components. German vehicle manufacturer BMW acted as a consultant on the styling of the BK 117. As per their agreement, each company established their own final assembly line for the type, on which they would produce the rotorcraft to meet demands within their respective local markets.

Originally, each company intended to construct a pair of prototypes (in actuality, Kawasaki opted to only build a single prototype) which were to be completed by 1979; one for flight testing purposes and the others for tie down testing and static testing. On 13 June 1979, MBB's flying prototype conducted its maiden flight at Ottobrunn, Bavaria, Germany; months later, it was followed by the Kawasaki prototype at Gifu, Chūbu region, Japan on 10 August 1979. The pace of development on the program had been slower than expected, a problem that was exacerbated by a shortage of skilled manpower that was available at MBB. Although it was originally planned for the rotorcraft's airworthiness certification to be achieved before the end of 1980, German certification was not achieved until 9 December 1982, being quickly followed by the receipt of Japanese certification on 17 December 1982. On 29 March 1983, the type secured the all-important United States Federal Aviation Administration (FAA) certification, clearing it for widespread use.

=== Further development ===
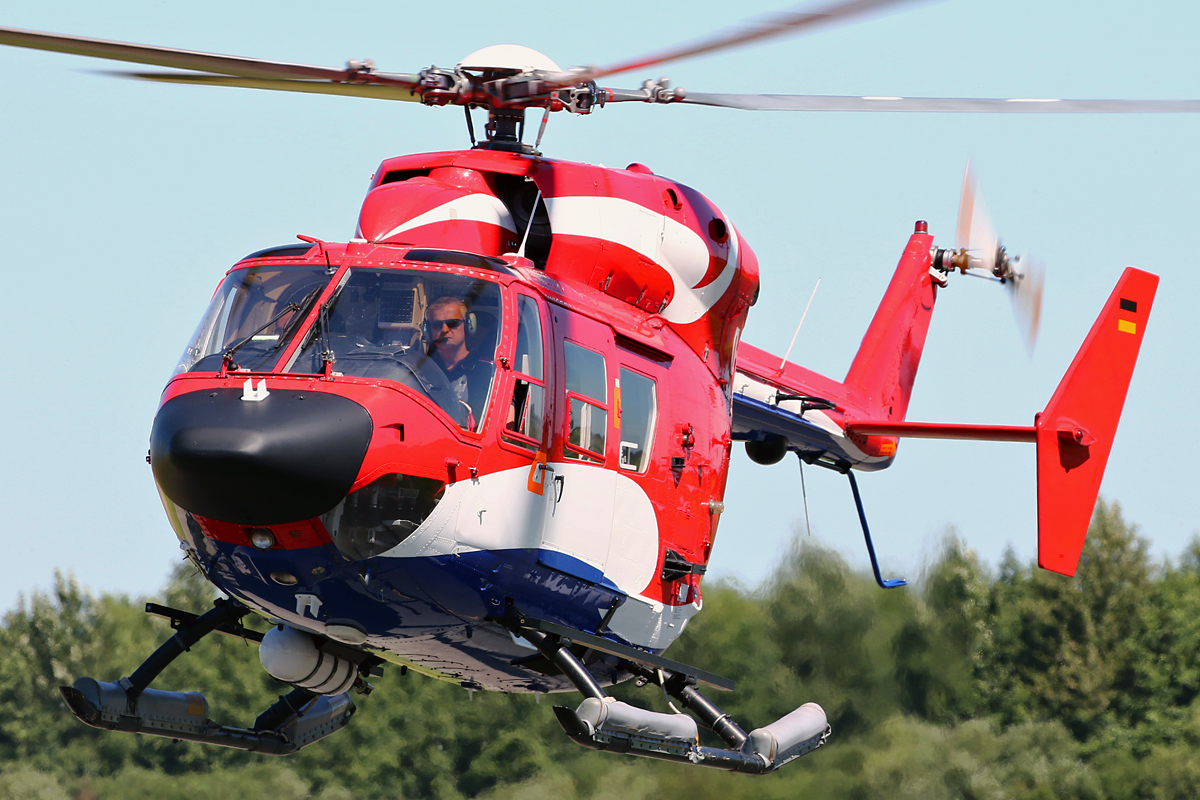
BK 117 in 2018

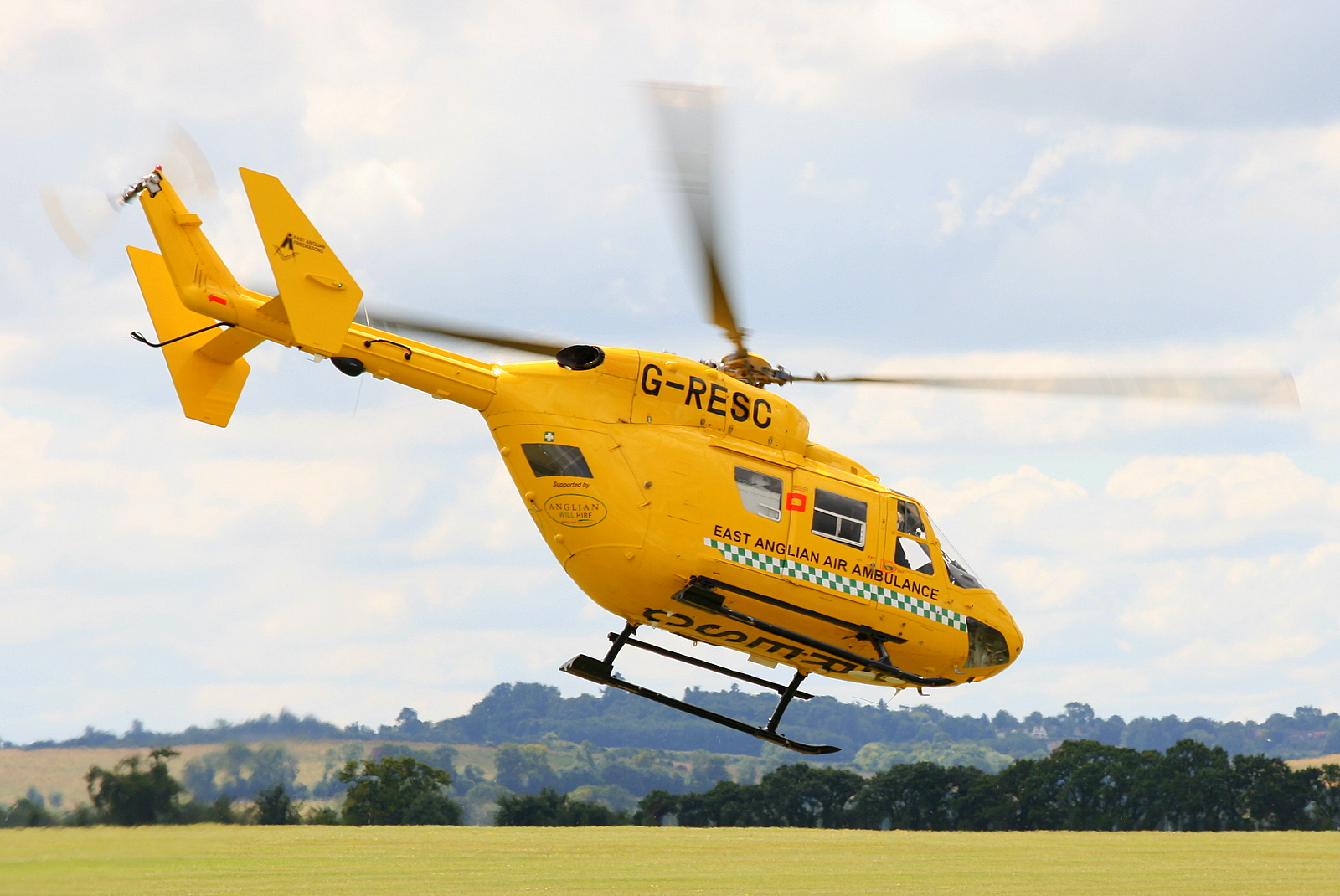
In service as an air ambulance, 2008

During 1983, the initial production version, designated as the BK 117A-1 was first delivered. Improved variants were quickly developed; in early 1985, the BK 117A-3, featuring an increased maximum takeoff weight and an enlarged tail rotor with twisted airfoils, was certified; two years later, the BK 117A-4, equipped with LTS 101-750B-1 engines for improved hot/high performance and increased maximum takeoff weight, along with improvements to the main rotor transmission and tail rotor mast, as well as a larger capacity fuel tank, was introduced. During 1990, MBB's American division launched a dedicated corporate version of the BK 117; it was furnished with a Honeywell-built SPZ-7000 digital automatic flight control system and a cocoon-type interior system; optional extras included a Bendix/King electronic flight instrumentation system (EFIS) and a clamshell cabin door. During 1992, the BK 117C-1, equipped with a revised EFIS panel and an improved environmental control system, along with greater hot-and-high performance, was introduced to service.

At one stage, there was considerable attention paid to the concept of a dedicated militarized variant of the type. During the 1985 Paris Air Show, the concept of an armed attack helicopter derivative, referred to as the BK 117A-3M, was revealed to the general public. As promoted, this variant would have been capable of being armed with launchers for eight Euromissile HOT 2 missiles and a chin-mounted Lucas-built turret for a Browning 12.7mm machine gun, aimed using a helmet-mounted sight. It was also to be equipped with various advanced targeting sensors, including an SFIM APX-M 397 roof-mounted stabilized sight. In order to provide sufficient ground clearance for the gun turret, the use of higher skid landing gear would have also been necessitated.

During the 1990s, as a result of the commercial success of the type, a refined derivative, initially marketed as the BK 117 C-2 prior to its rebranding as the EC 145 and later as the H145, was developed from the BK 117 C-1 version; this improved version of the rotorcraft has succeeded and eventually replaced the original BK 117 in production. In total, 443 BK 117s were manufactured by the two partners; 329 (and two prototypes) were produced by MBB at their Donauworth facility while 111 (and one prototype) were completed by Kawasaki in Japan. During the 1980s, an agreement was formed with Indonesian Aerospace, enabling the type to be produced under license in Indonesia, which was accordingly designated as the NBK 117; however, according to economics author Sören Eriksson, the Indonesian production program was terminated after only a handful of rotorcraft were completed.

Since exiting production, third parties have produced their own upgrade program for existing BK 117s. In 2010, Airwork launched its conversion program for the type, replacing the original LTS101-750B-1 engine with the newer LTS101-850B-2 engine, increasing both its performance, reliability and safety margins, resulting in the BK117-850D2; by 2016, Airwork had upgraded nearly 50 rotorcraft in this manner.

== Design ==
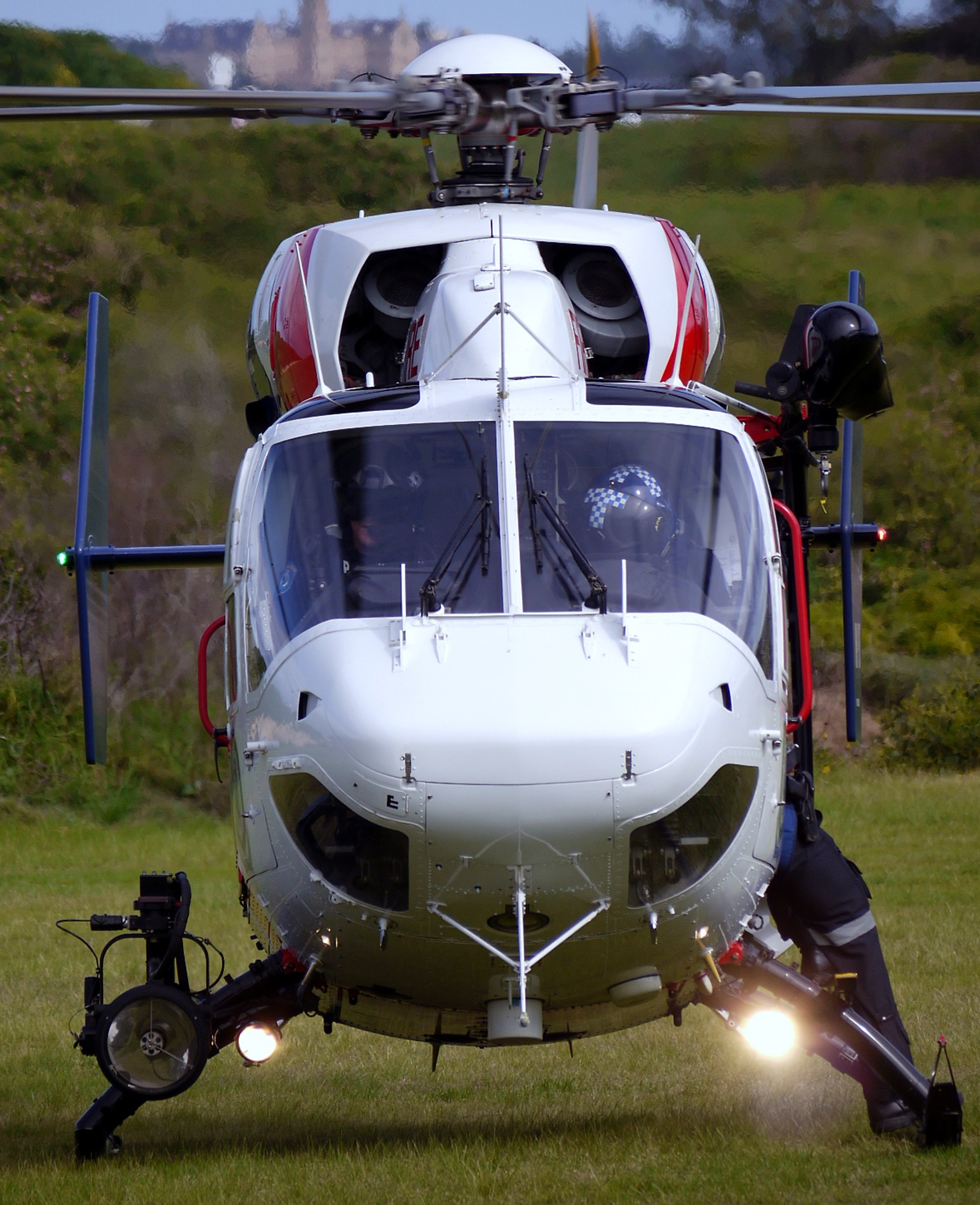
Head on view of BK 117

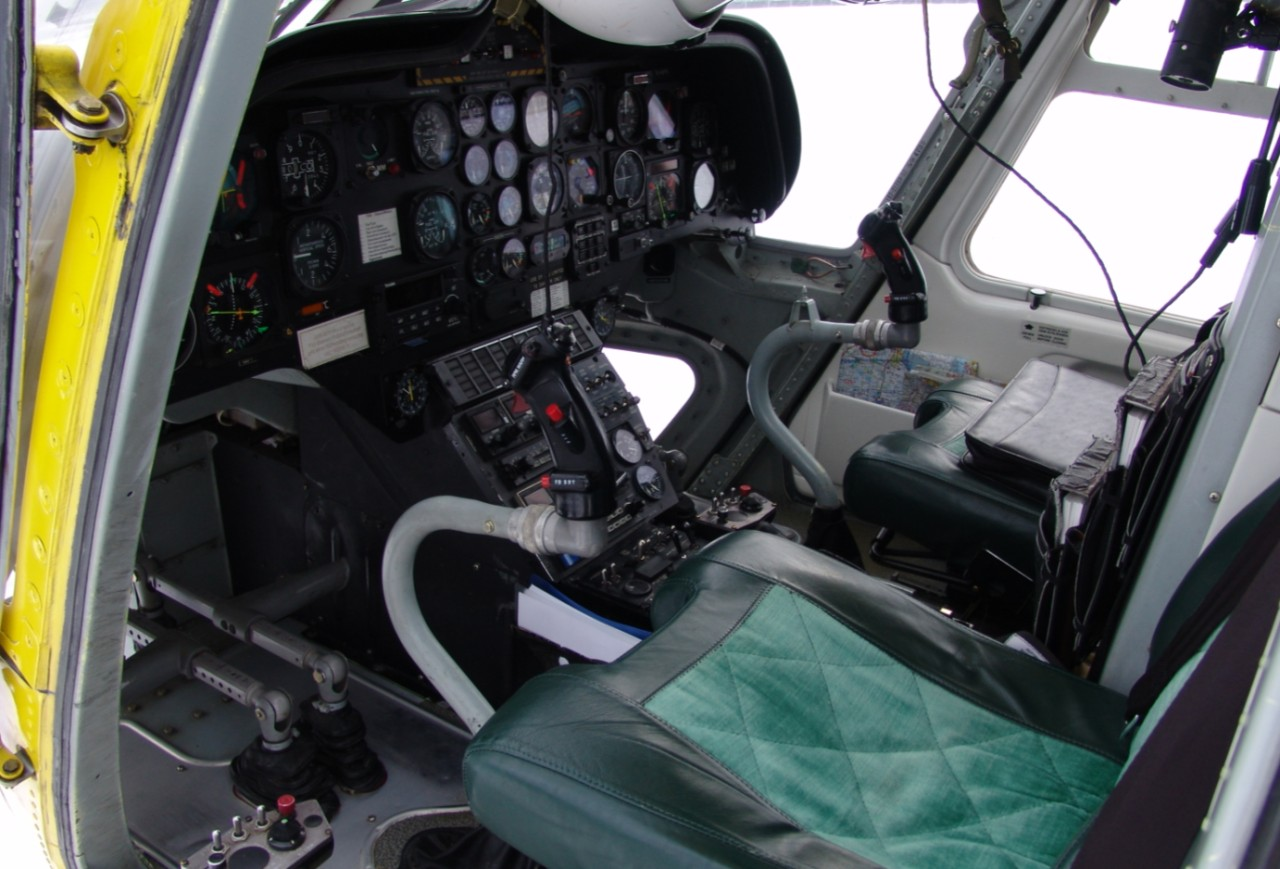
Bk 117 B2 cockpit

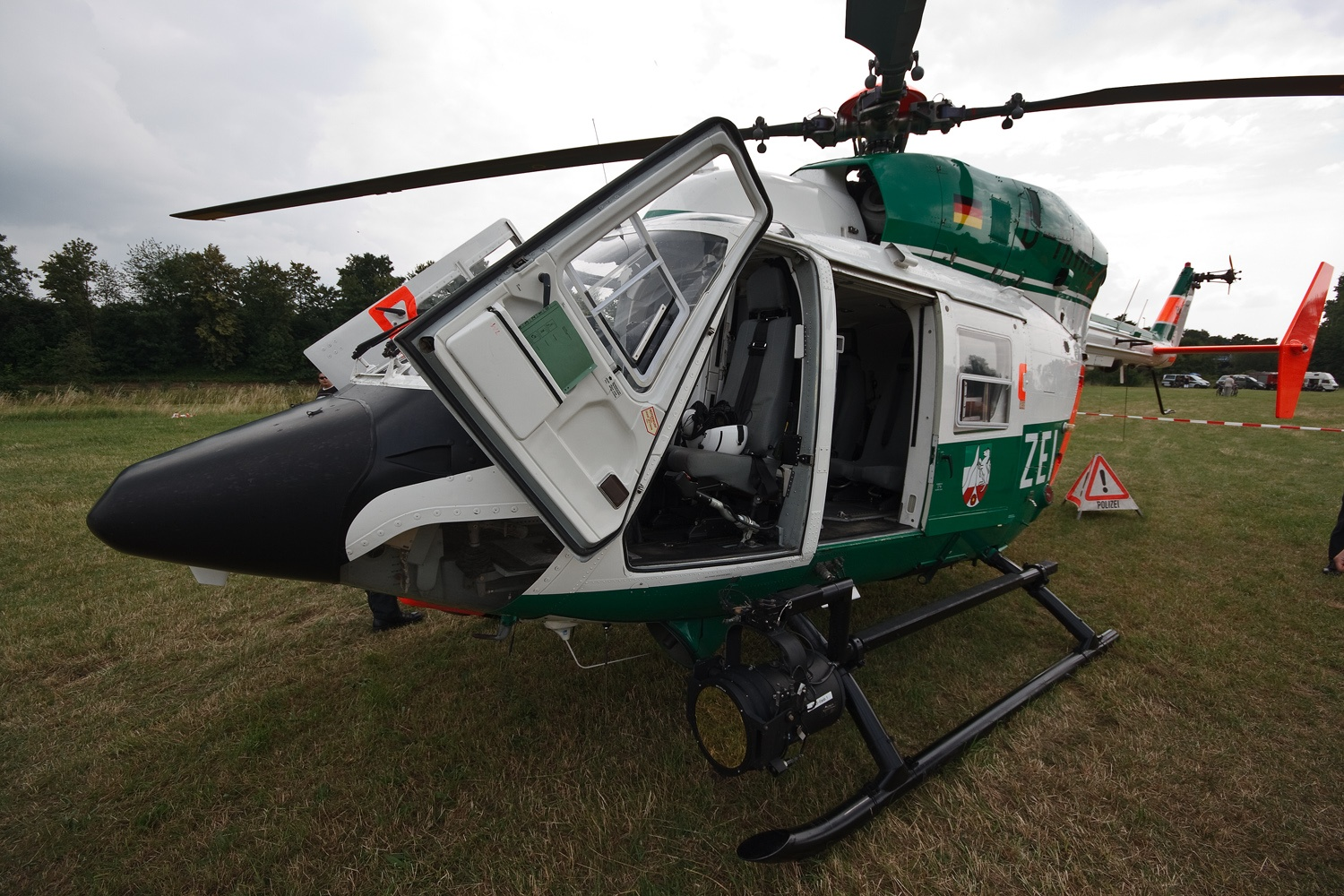
Doors open BK 117 P2

The MBB/Kawasaki BK 117 is a twin-engined medium utility–transport helicopter. It possessed several attributes that lend itself to performing many different roles, such as twin-engine redundancy, sizable clamshell-shaped rear-facing double doors, and a relatively spacious cabin; one mission to which it was deemed to be suitable was the emergency medical services (EMS). The airframe is composed of rivetted metal, making minimal use of composite materials. In order to free up internal space, both the engines and transmission are positioned above the main cabin. Considerable efforts were made to reduce the weight of the aircraft without compromising the aircraft's structural integrity. The cabin could be configured with various interiors in order to suit its purpose.

Early versions of the BK 117 were powered by a pair of Lycoming LTS101 turboshaft engines, rated to generate 550 shp at takeoff with considerable reserve power to guard against a single engine failure. While each engine possesses sufficient power to maintain flight and even takeoff in the event of a single engine being rendered inoperable, the type also has favorable autorotation capabilities. In order to extend their operational lifespan and increase their reliability, MBB tuned the engines to operate at lower-than-standard revolutions per minute (RPM). The engines are regulated using a specialized control system which smoothly and evenly regulate RPM and torque between both engines, even during vigorous maneuvers. Power management has been greatly eased via the addition of an automatic engine-governor system, allowing pilots to simply monitor the torque and engine temperature gauges. The aircraft can be suitably equipped for flight under instrument flight rules (IFR) as well as for single-pilot operations.

According to aviation publication Flying, as a consequence of its uncommon rigid main rotor system, the BK 117 possessed relatively high stability and maneuverability which, amongst other capabilities, reportedly gave the type the ability to perform a steeper approach than any other helicopter in its class. The four-bladed main rotor was smaller and slower-turning than many of its contemporaries, reducing both vibration and noise while also enabling the type to use more compact landing sites. The high-mounted tail boom and tail rotor of the BK 117 also presented several benefits, such as enhanced safety to personnel on the ground. In terms of its flight performance, the type was considered to be suitable for the execution of various aerobatic maneuvers, such as flying loops and rolls, while retaining such levels of inherent stability that pilots could readily release both the cyclic and collective controls, unlike the majority of rotorcraft. An optional Sperry-built three-axis stability augmentation system also served to improve the rotorcraft's ease of handling.

== Accidents and incidents ==
A BK 117-B2 helicopter contracted by the New South Wales Rural Fire Service to fight fires crashed on 17 August 2018, the pilot died in the crash.

A BK 117-B2 helicopter operated by Search and Rescue Services Limited crashed into Mount Pirongia on 19 September 2023 after the helicopter rapidly dropped in height, of the 3 people abroad, all survived.

A BK 117-B2 helicopter owned by Air Methods LLC crashed on 24 April 2025 during takeoff near the runway, of the 3 people aboard all survived.

A BK 117-B2 helicopter owned by Airmedic crashed on 20 June 2025 during takeoff in a lake, of the 5 people aboard, 4 died, including the patient.

A BK 117-D3 helicopter owned by Eastindo Air crashed on 1 September 2025 near a waterfall, of the 8 aboard, all were killed.

== Operational history ==
A single BK 117 A-3 (c/n 7106) was leased by the Canadian Forces Air Command for a test program and designated as the CH-143. When the program was over, the aircraft was returned to MBB Canada.

== Variants ==
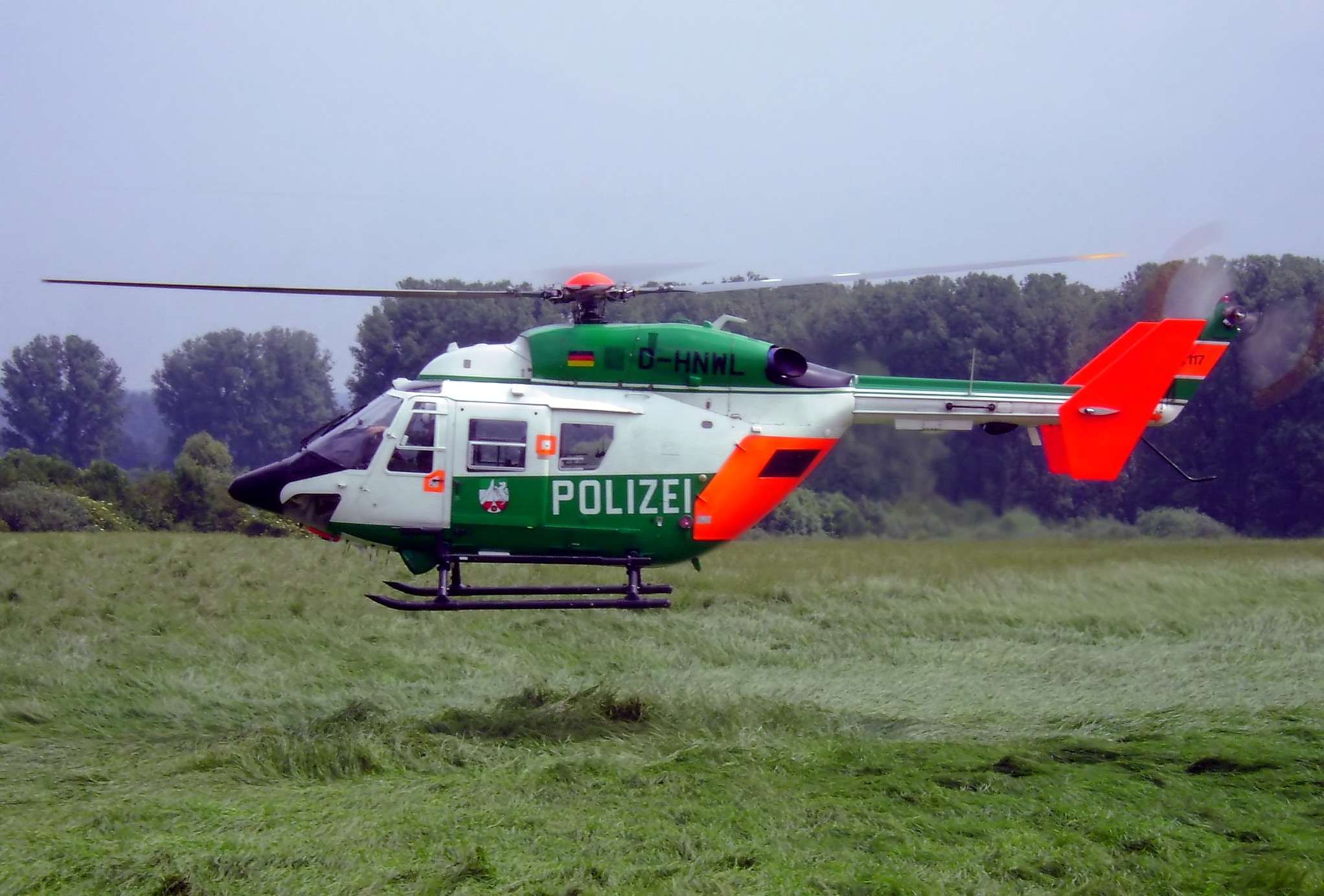
BK 117 P2 in Police service

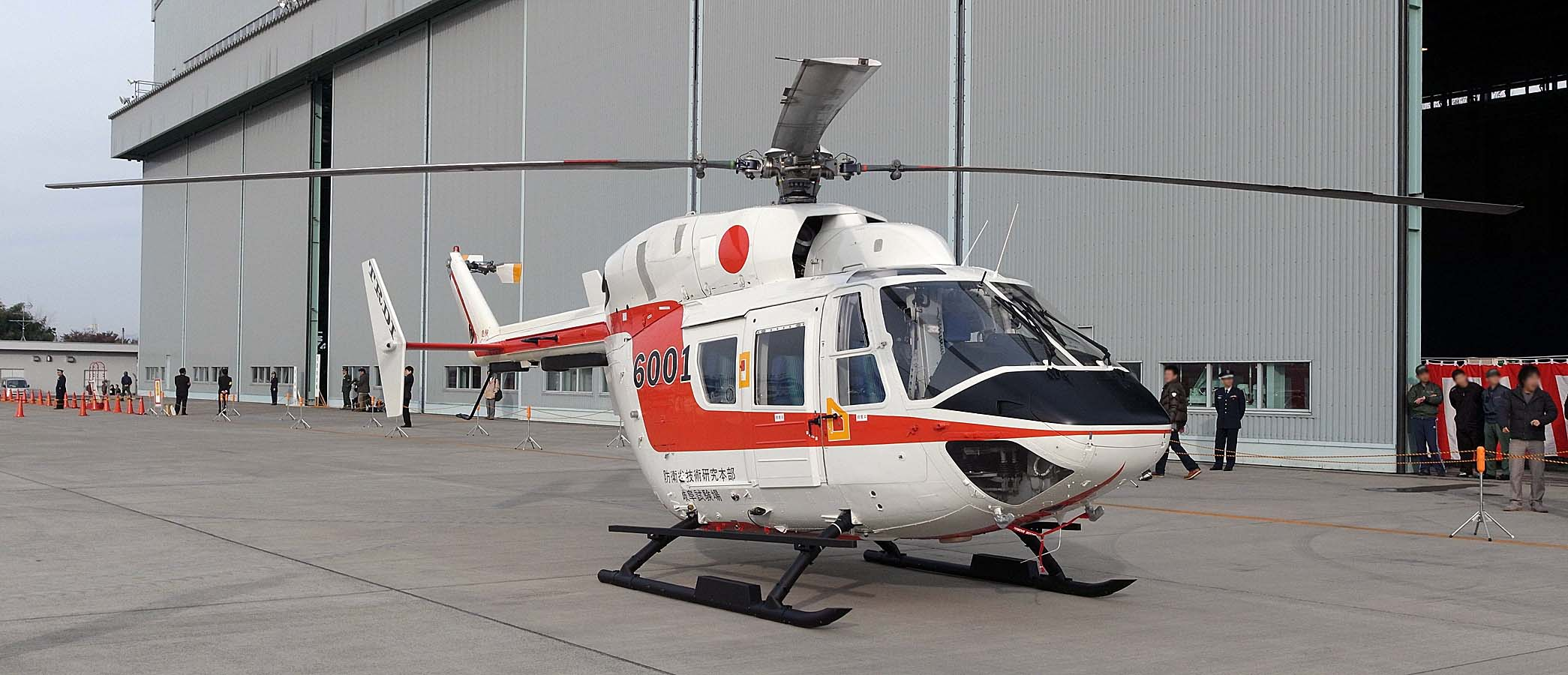
JASDF BK 117 A4

BK 117 P-2 (D-HBKA)
German prototype, first flown 13 June 1979. Now exhibited at the Bückeburg helicopter museum, Bückeburg, Germany.
BK 117 S-01 (D-HDRF)
Initial pre-production prototype. Now preserved on top of the DRF-Headquarters at Stuttgart Airport.
BK 117 P-3/P-5 (JQ0003)
Japanese prototype, first flown 10 August 1979. Now exhibited at Kakamigahara Aerospace Museum, Kakamigahara/Gifu, Japan
BK 117 A-1
Powered by two Lycoming LTS 101-650B-1 engines. First flown 23 April 1982.
BK 117 A-3
Introduced in March 1985, the A-3 has a larger tail rotor with improved blades, Yaw CSAS, improved stability (SPAS) and the take-off weight increased to 3,200 kg (7,055 lb).- The Canadian Armed forces leased a single BK 117-A3 for a test program and designated it the CH-143. When the program was over, the aircraft was returned to MBB Canada
BK 117 A-4
Introduced in July 1986, the A-4 has increased transmission limits at take-off power, improved tail rotor head. German aircraft have provision for extra internal fuel, giving enhanced performance.
BK 117 A-3M
Military version introduced in 1986. The A-3M is fitted with taller skids and can carry 11 troops. A Browning 12.7 mm (0.5 in) machine gun can be mounted under the fuselage in a Lucas turret with 450 rounds and controlled by a helmet-mounted sight. The A-3M also has outrigger pylons which can hold up to eight HOT II or TOW antitank missiles or a variety of air-to-air missiles, rocket-pods, or forward-firing cannons. Provisions for a doorway gunner's position with a 12.7 mm (0.5 in) gun can also be installed.
BK 117 B-1
Introduced in December 1987, the B-1 is fitted with LTS 101-750B-1 engines to provide increased performance, and a 140 kg (309 lb) increase in payload.
BK 117 B-1C
UK-certified version with reduced range and endurance.
BK 117 B-2
Maximum Gross Weight increased to 3,350 kg, 2 x Allied Signal Lycoming LTS101-750B-1 engines fitted as standard, new tail rotor blades, improved "hot and high" performance, take-off/landing limitation increased to 15,000 ft, improved flight performance for: HIGE/HOGE, single engine service ceiling.
BK 117 C-1
Powered by two Turbomeca Arriel 1E engines. Later models may be upgraded to Arriel 1E2 engines.
NBK 117
License-built model produced in Indonesia by Indonesian Aerospace.
BK 117-850D2
Introduced in 2010, the 850D2 variant is an STC (Supplementary Type Certificate) development (i.e., re-engined) of BK 117 B-2 incorporating Honeywell LTS 101-850B-2 engines aimed at improving OEI and Category A performance. Development and certification was conducted in New Zealand by Airwork of Ardmore, NZ, in conjunction with Flight Structures Ltd.

NOTE: All later models are derived from the BK 117 by (initially) Eurocopter Deutschland and (later) Airbus Helicopters. The models BK 117-C2, -D2, and -D3 are therefore better known under their commercial naming convention as the EC145 or H145. Nevertheless, all models share the same EASA Type Certificate (see EASA Type Certificate Data Sheet).

== Operators ==
=== Military and government ===
Australia

- Fire and Rescue NSW (formerly)
- New South Wales Rural Fire Service

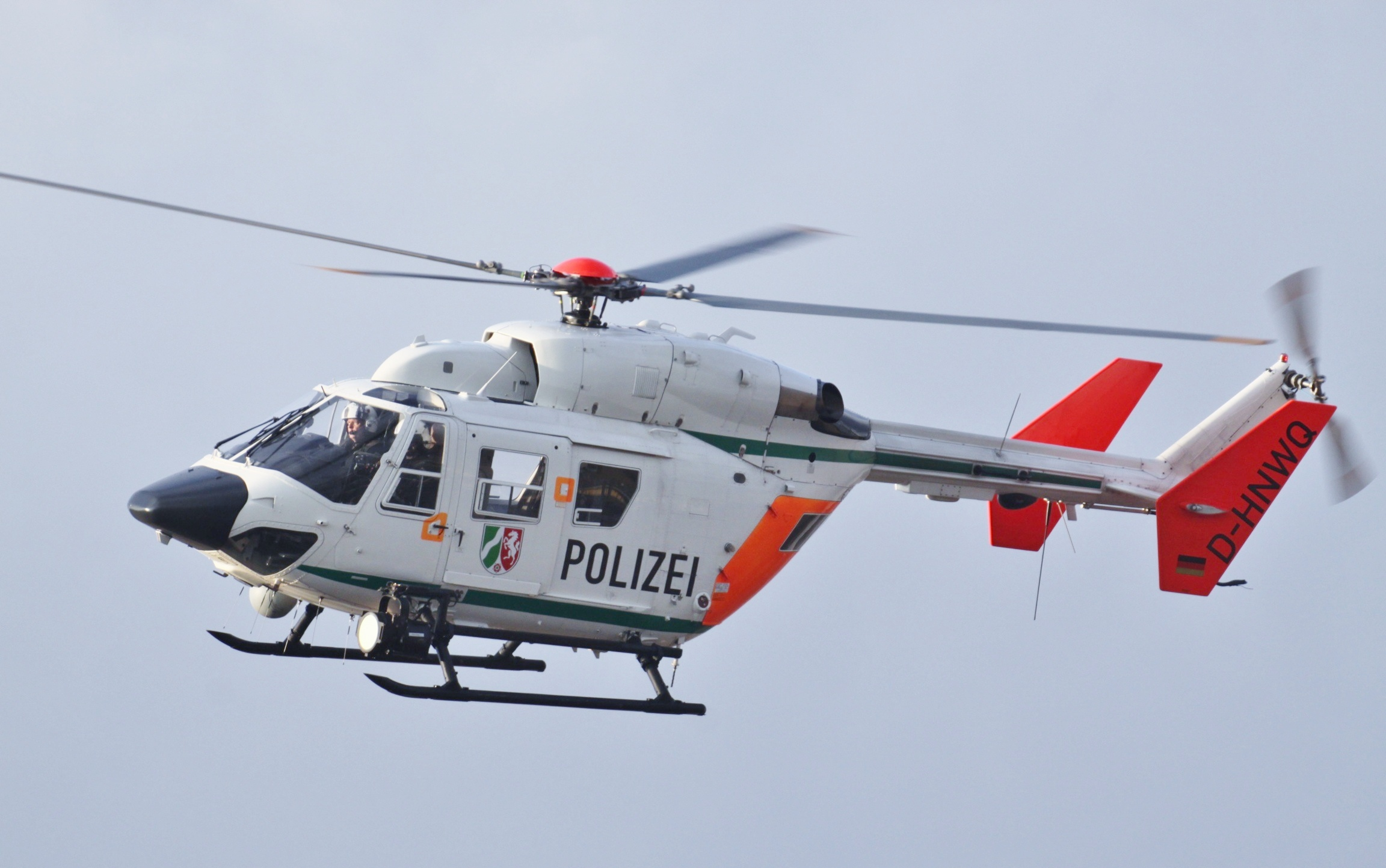
A Polizei BK 117

- Western Australia Police

Chile

- Chilean Air Force
- Carabineros de Chile

Colombia

- Colombian National Armada

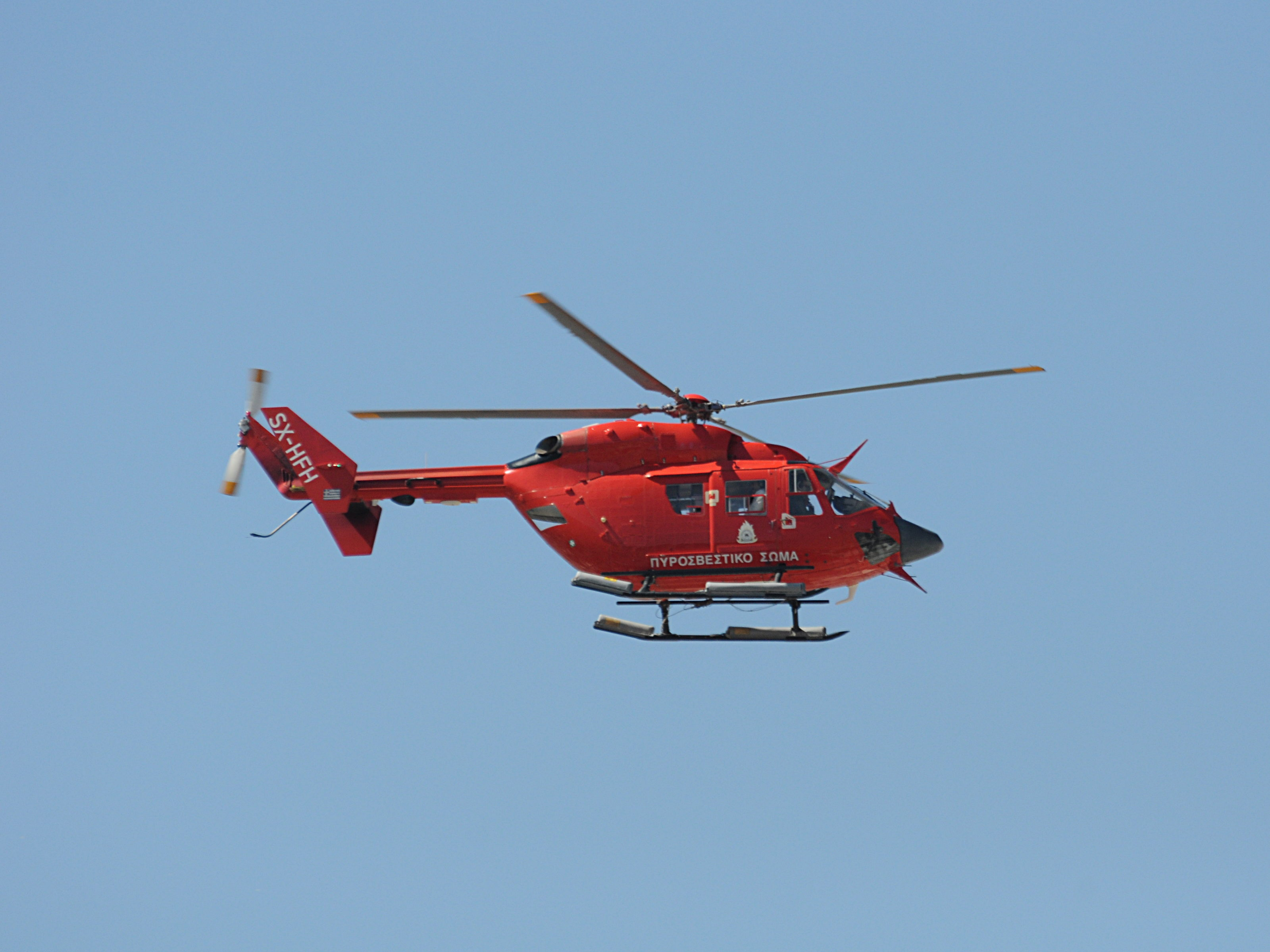
SX-HFH. a BK-117 of the Hellenic Fire Service

Greece

- Hellenic Fire Service – Operates three BK-117C1s.

Japan

- Prefectural police departments
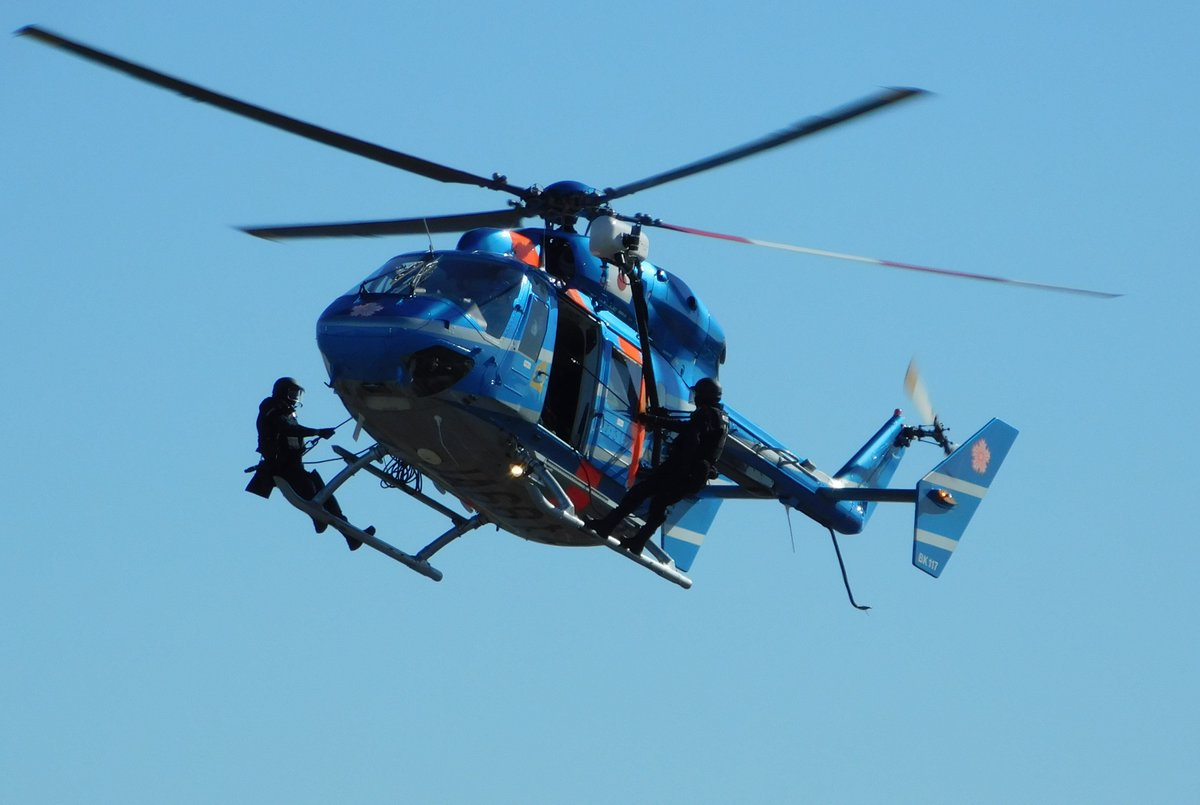
  Saitama Prefectural Police BK 117

Madagascar

- Malagasy Air Force

Peru

- Peruvian National Police

Russia

- Ministry of Emergency Situations

Spain

- Guardia Civil

South Africa

- South African Air Force
- South African Police Service

United States

- Riverside County Sheriff's Department (California)

=== Civil ===
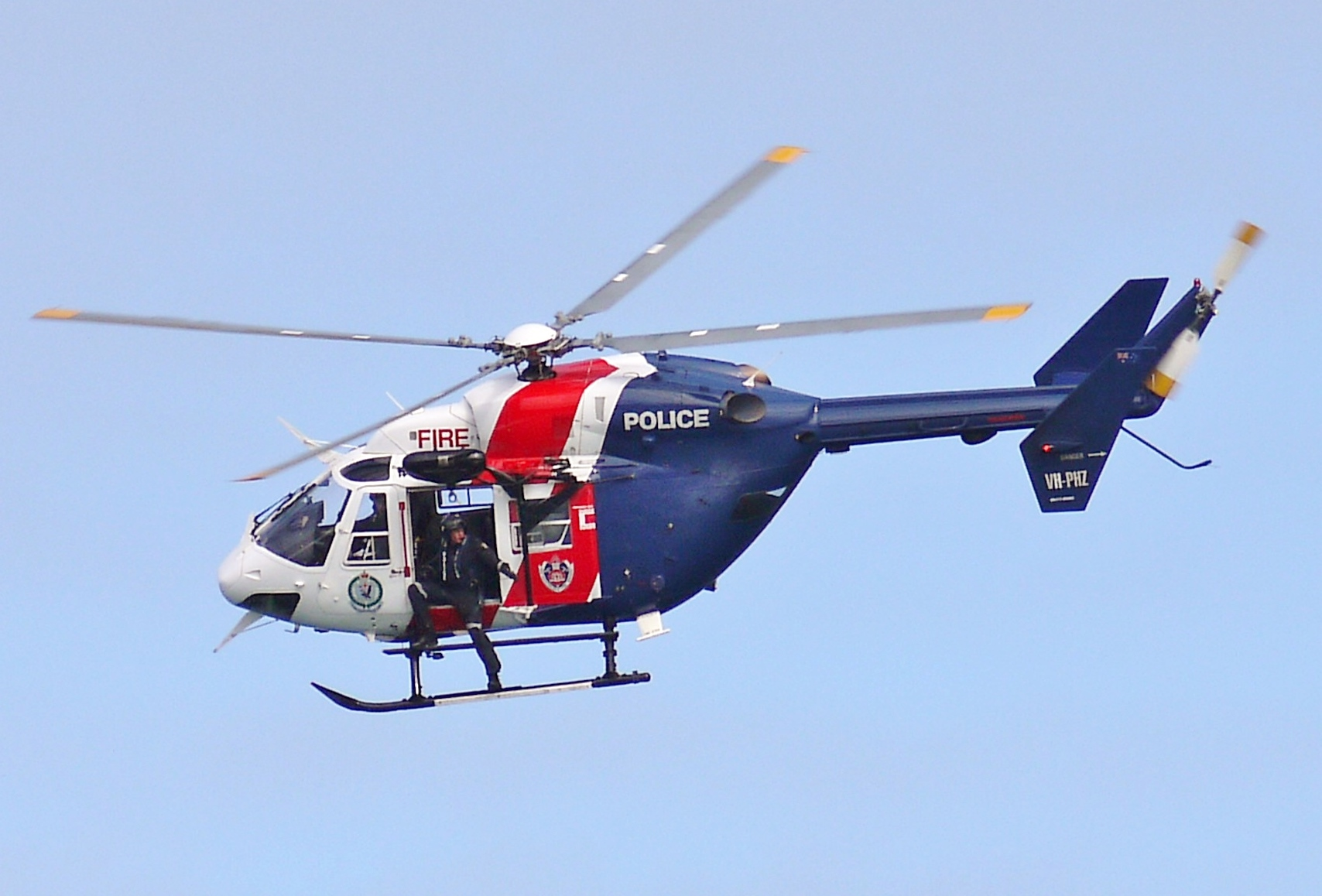
A PolAir 5' BK 117 in flight

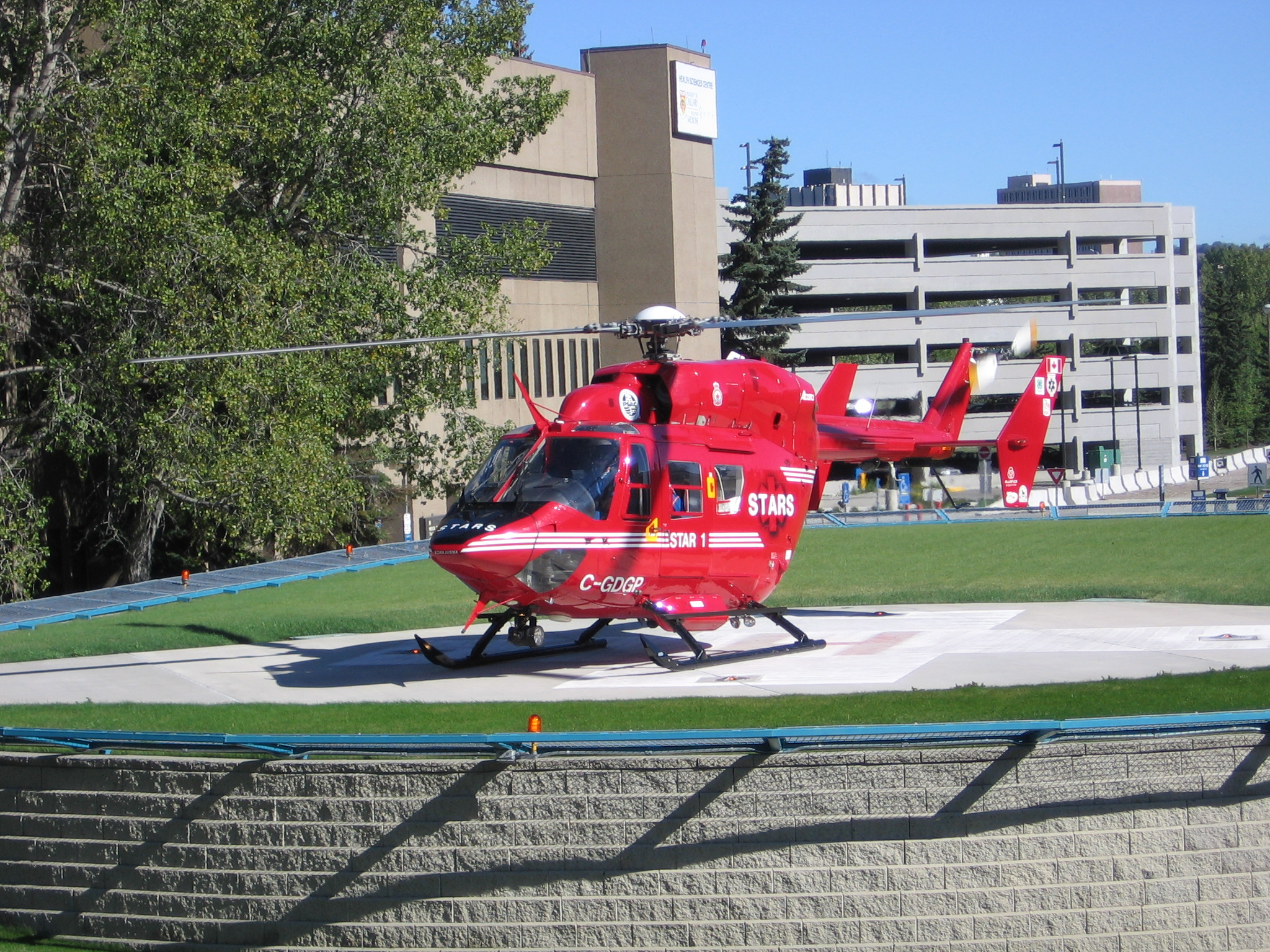
STARS Air Ambulance at Foothills Medical Centre in Canada

The majority of the helicopters are operated by various emergency services although it is also operated by private individuals, companies and executive charter operators.

Australia

- CareFlight
- Westpac Life Saver Rescue Service

Canada

- Yellowhead Helicopters Ltd.
- Shock Trauma Air Rescue Society
- Helico Secours
- Airmedic (ceased operations of helicopters)
- HALO Air Ambulance

Kenya

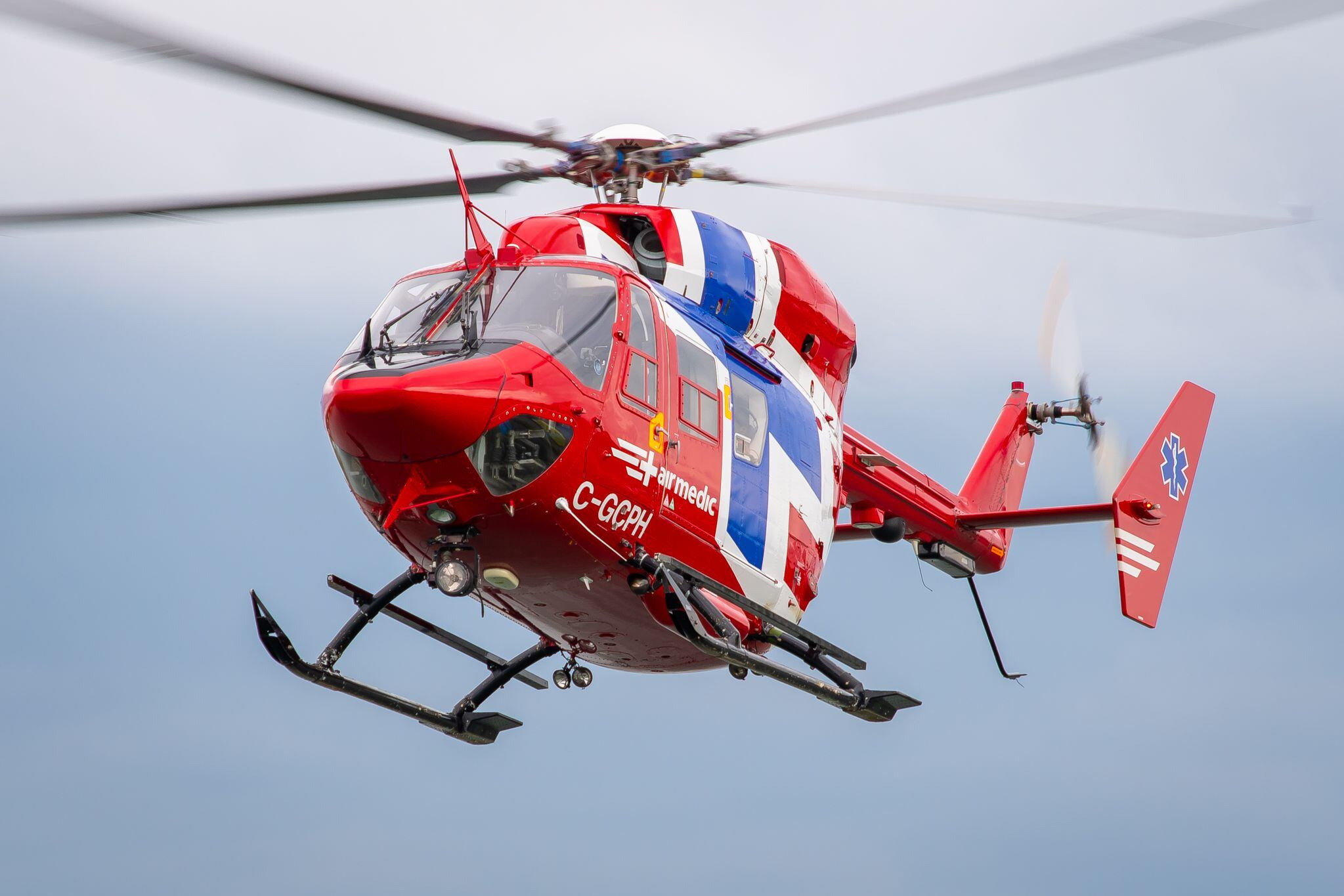
Airmedic BK117 B2 in flight

- Everett Aviation

New Zealand

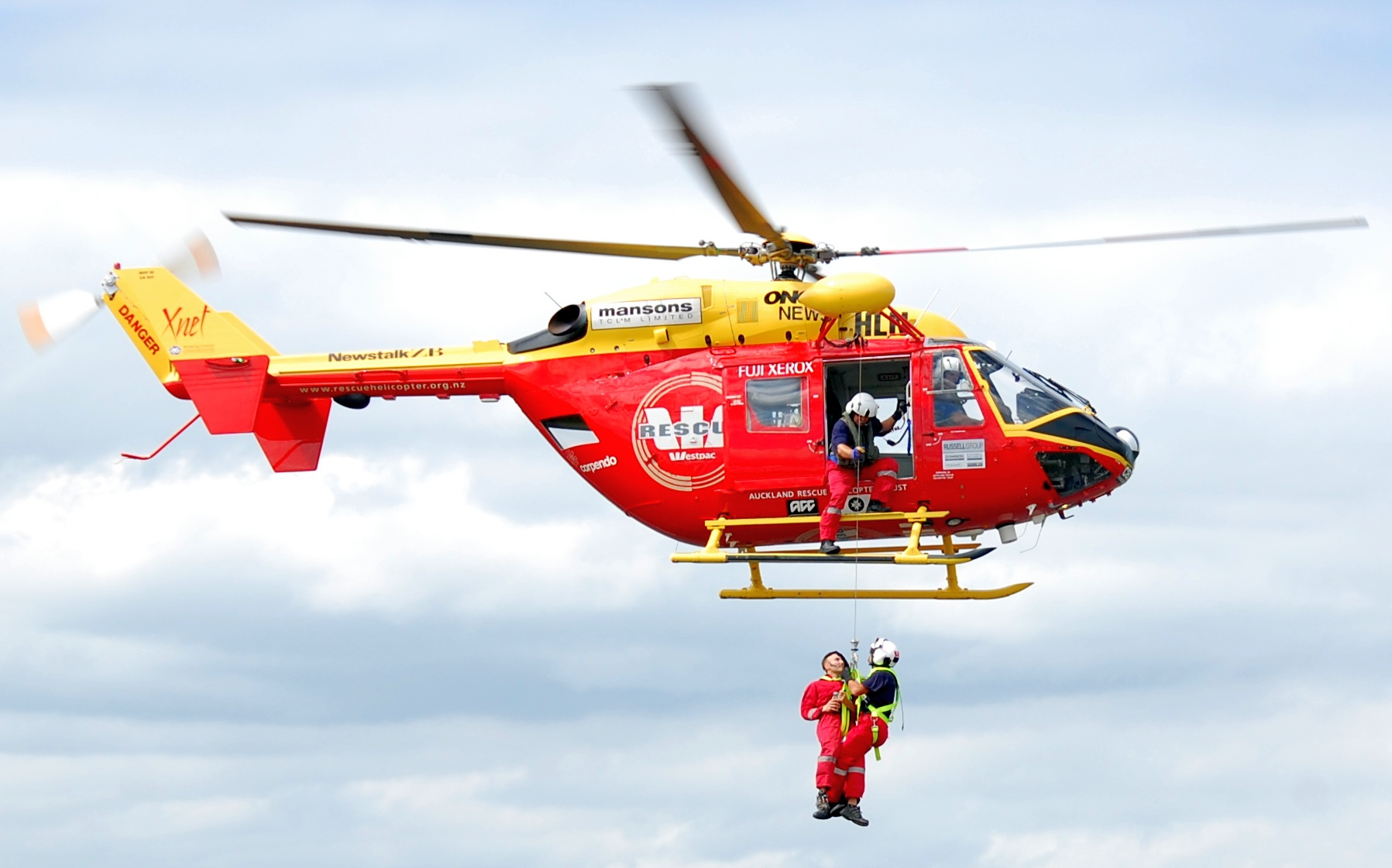
BK 117 in service with Auckland Rescue Helicopter Trust

- Auckland Rescue Helicopter Trust
- Life Flight (New Zealand)
- Canterbury West Coast Air Rescue Trust
- Otago Rescue Helicopter Trust

Switzerland

- Rega (air rescue) : 7 H145 since 2018, replacing the EC145

Taiwan

- Daily Air

Thailand

- Si Chang Flying Services

United States

- Air Methods
- St. Louis Children's Hospital
- Orlando Regional Medical Center

=== Former ===
Bophuthatswana

- Bophuthatswana Air Force

Canada

- Canadian Forces Air Command

Ciskei

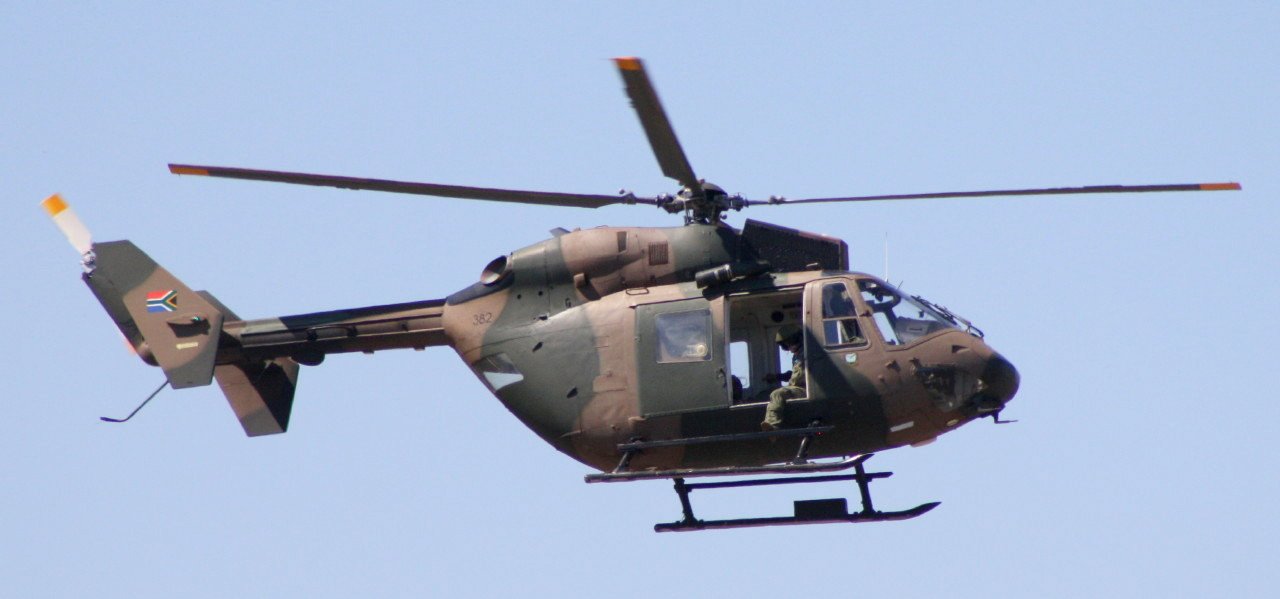
BK 117 in service with the South African Air Force

- Ciskei Defence Force

Germany

- ADAC
- DRF Luftrettung
- Bundeswehr
- German State Police

Transkei

- Transkei Defence Force

Venda

- Venda Defence Force

== Specifications (BK 117 B-2) ==
Data from Jane's All The World's Aircraft 1993–94

General characteristics

- Crew: 1
- Capacity: up to 10 passengers
- Length: 9.91 m (32 ft 6 in) (fuselage length)
- Height: 3.85 m (12 ft 8 in) (rotors turning)
- Empty weight: 1,727 kg (3,807 lb)
- Max takeoff weight: 3,350 kg (7,385 lb)
- Fuel capacity: 697 L (183 US Gallons, 153 Imp Gallons) internal fuel
- Powerplant: 2 × Textron Lycoming LTS 101-750B-1 turboshaft, 442 kW (593 hp) each
- Main rotor diameter: 11.00 m (36 ft 1 in)
- Main rotor area: 95.03 m^{2} (1,022.9 sq ft)

Performance

- Maximum speed: 250 km/h (160 mph, 130 kn) at sea level
- Never exceed speed: 278 km/h (173 mph, 150 kn)
- Range: 541 km (336 mi, 292 nmi)
- Service ceiling: 4,575 m (15,010 ft) (max certified altitude)
- Hover Ceiling: 3,565 m (11,700 ft) (in ground effect)
- Rate of climb: 11.00 m/s (2,165 ft/min)

== See also ==
- Helicopter
- Air ambulance

Related development

- MBB Bo 105
- Eurocopter EC135
- Eurocopter EC145
