= Bölkow Bo 102 =

Bo 102
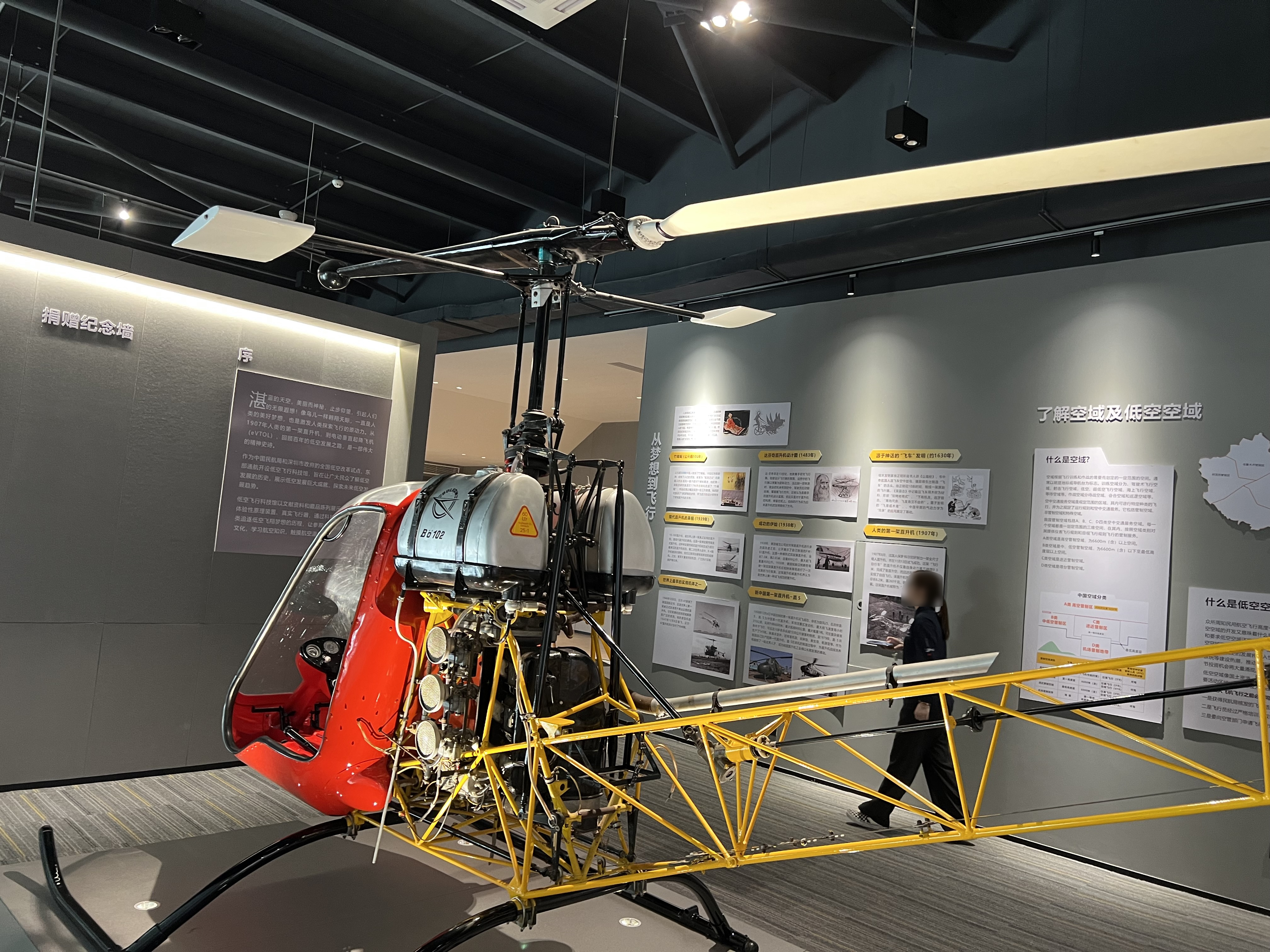
- Bölkow Bo 102 on display at the Helicopter Museum (Weston)

General information
- Type: Helicopter flight training aid
- National origin: West Germany
- Manufacturer: Bölkow Entwicklungen KG
- Number built: 18

History
- First flight: Not flown

The Bölkow Bo 102 Helitrainer was an unusual ground-based helicopter training aid that was developed and built by Bölkow of West Germany in the late-1950s. Designed to be mounted on a swivelling captive rig the Bo 102 allowed trainee pilots to practise procedures such as engine starting, rotor engagement and manipulation of the flight controls. Many of the Bo 102's components, including the single-bladed fibre-glass main rotor were used in the company's next design, the Bo 103.

== Aircraft on display ==
Preserved examples of the Bo 102 are on public display at the Hubschraubermuseum Bückeburg, the Helicopter Museum (Weston), Classic Rotors Helicopter Museum, Ramona, California, Heli-Eastern, Yantian, China and in Rota, Spain.

== Specifications (Bo 102) ==
General characteristics

- Crew: One
- Gross weight: 700 kg (1,697 lb)
- Powerplant: 1 × ILO, 3-cylinder, two-stroke , 30 kW (40 hp)
- Main rotor diameter: 6.6 m (21 ft 8 in)
- Main rotor area: 34.8 m^{2} (374 sq ft)

Performance

== See also ==
Related development

- Bölkow Bo 103

Related lists

- List of rotorcraft
