= Bölkow Bo 103 =

Bo 103
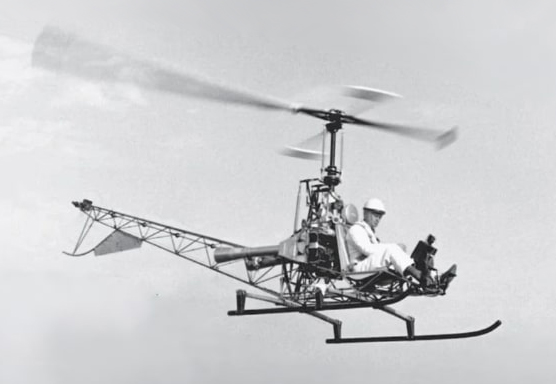
- Bölkow Bo 103 prototype in flight

General information
- Type: Experimental helicopter
- National origin: West Germany
- Manufacturer: Bölkow
- Number built: 1

History
- First flight: 14 September 1961

The Bölkow Bo 103 was an ultralight experimental helicopter flown in West Germany in 1961. It was designed for reconnaissance and command-control purposes and was constructed by Bölkow Entwicklungen KG as part of a research order by the German Federal Ministry of Defense.

While the mechanics of the aircraft were based on the Bo 102 captive training rig, the Bo 103 was capable of fully independent flight. In configuration, it was absolutely minimalist - consisting of nothing more than a tubular frame to which the dynamic components and the pilots seat were attached, although a small fibreglass cabin was eventually attached. The aircraft retained the Bo 102's single-rotor of Glass-reinforced plastic, and proved that this was suitable for true flight. A single prototype was built, but work was stopped in 1962 due to lack of interest on the part of the West German armed forces. The prototype is preserved at the Hubschraubermuseum Bückeburg.

== Specifications ==
General characteristics

- Crew: 1
- Height: 2.41 m (7 ft 11 in)
- Empty weight: 268 kg (591 lb)
- Gross weight: 390 kg (860 lb)
- Powerplant: 1 × Agusta GA.70 4-cylinder air-cooled horizontally-opposed piston engine, 61 kW (82 hp)
- Main rotor diameter: 6.66 m (21 ft 10 in)
- Main rotor area: 34.8 m^{2} (375 sq ft) single bladed counter-balanced rotor

Performance

- Maximum speed: 100 km/h (62 mph, 54 kn)
- Range: 100 km (62 mi, 54 nmi)
- Rate of climb: 5.7 m/s (1,120 ft/min)

== See also ==
Related development

- Bölkow Bo 102

Related lists

- List of experimental aircraft
