= Ludwig Bölkow =

German aerospace engineer (1912–2003)

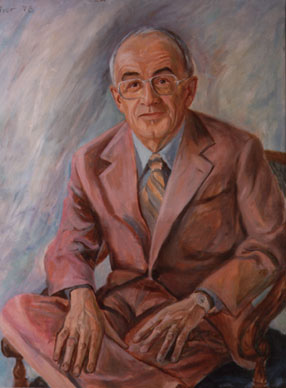
- Portrait by Günter Rittner, 1978
- Born: 30 June 1912; Schwerin, German Empire
- Died: 25 July 2003 (aged 91); Munich, Bavaria, Germany
- Occupation: Aerospace engineering

Ludwig Bölkow (30 June 1912 – 25 July 2003) was a German aeronautical engineer.

== Background ==
Born in Schwerin, in then north-central Germany, in 1912, Bölkow was the son of a foreman employed by Fokker, one of the leading aircraft constructors of that time.

== Early career ==
Bölkow's first job was with Heinkel, the aircraft company, before studying aero-engineering at the Technische Hochschule in Charlottenburg (now Technische Universität Berlin). On graduation, in 1939, he joined the project office of Messerschmitt AG in Augsburg, where he served initially as a clerk, later as a group leader for high-speed aerodynamics, especially for the Messerschmitt Me 262 and its successors. In January 1943, he was appointed head of the Messerschmitt Bf 109 development office in Vienna. A year later, Bölkow returned to the Messerschmitt project office, which had meanwhile moved to Oberammergau. There he set up a program for the development of the Messerschmitt P.1101 jet fighter.

== Later career ==
After the war he created the Bölkow GmbH in Ottobrunn, which with time grew to the biggest aeronautics and spaceflight company, MBB (Messerschmitt-Bölkow-Blohm). In the early 1990s it was bought by DASA.

He carried out the construction of the first German satellite, Azur, launched in 1969.

Bölkow was awarded the Ludwig-Prandtl-Ring from the Deutsche Gesellschaft für Luft- und Raumfahrt (German Society for Aeronautics and Astronautics) for "outstanding contribution in the field of aerospace engineering" in 1972. He was awarded a Gold Medal by the British Royal Aeronautical Society in 1978.

== See also ==
- Messerschmitt Me 262
- Messerschmitt
