= Emergency medical services in New Zealand =

Emergency medical services in New Zealand (more commonly known as Ambulance) are provided by Hato Hone St John, except in the Greater Wellington region where Wellington Free Ambulance provides these services. Both have a history of long service to their communities, St John since 1885 and Free beginning in 1927, traditionally having a volunteer base, however the vast majority of response work is undertaken by paid career paramedics. Strategic leadership of the sector is provided by NASO (the National Ambulance Sector Office) which is a unit within the Ministry of Health responsible for coordinating the purchasing and funding of services on behalf of the Ministry and the Accident Compensation Corporation.

Funding occurs by means of billing part-charges for medical callouts (except Wellington Free) and charitable funding such as donations, bequests and corporate sponsorship to supplement Government funding. In recent years, the government has begun to examine more sustainable funding for ambulance services; however, there is still significant exertion within the sector that the level of funding provided falls far below what is required to cover the actual cost of service delivery.

== Organisation ==
Since the age of the motor vehicle many Hospital Boards ran their own services. From 1957 to 1990 the Hospital Act stipulated that Hospital Boards had to provide an ambulance service. Many contracted that out to St John or had ad hoc arrangements with them, often for after hours staffing. When the Hospital Act was replaced by Health Boards, many of these Boards saw this as a chance to avoid being responsible and subsequently St John took over from many Boards (e.g. Thames, Bay of Plenty, Wanganui, Palmerston North, Waipawa, Dannevirke, Nelson, West Coast, Ashburton, Southland). Marlborough stayed a Hospital-based service until 2007 and Taranaki until 2011. Wairarapa was the last region with a hospital-based service, ceasing in March 2012 and being taken over by Wellington Free Ambulance.

While both land ambulance service providers do have paid staff, they also rely very heavily on volunteer members. In most cases, paid staff tend to be concentrated in urban areas and in the management of rural areas, with rural response staff being largely volunteer-based. Hato Hone St John Ambulance reports a total of 3,353 paid staff in New Zealand, supplemented by 8,057 volunteers. By contrast, Wellington Free Ambulance currently staffs 108 paid paramedics and 35 volunteers, not including the 21 paid staff and 21 auxiliary (volunteer) staff previously from the Wairarapa DHB service.

=== Land ambulance ===
Hato Hone St John provides service to approximately 90 percent of the population of New Zealand, through a network of 1400 vehicles and 206 ambulance stations. Hato Hone St John Ambulance reports the completion of approximately 688,378 emergency responses. By contrast, Wellington Free Ambulance provides service to 10 percent of the population of New Zealand, providing service to more than 500,000 residents. They respond to an estimated 55,690 calls per year.

Land Ambulances in New Zealand

Hato Hone St John Ambulance station in Auckland

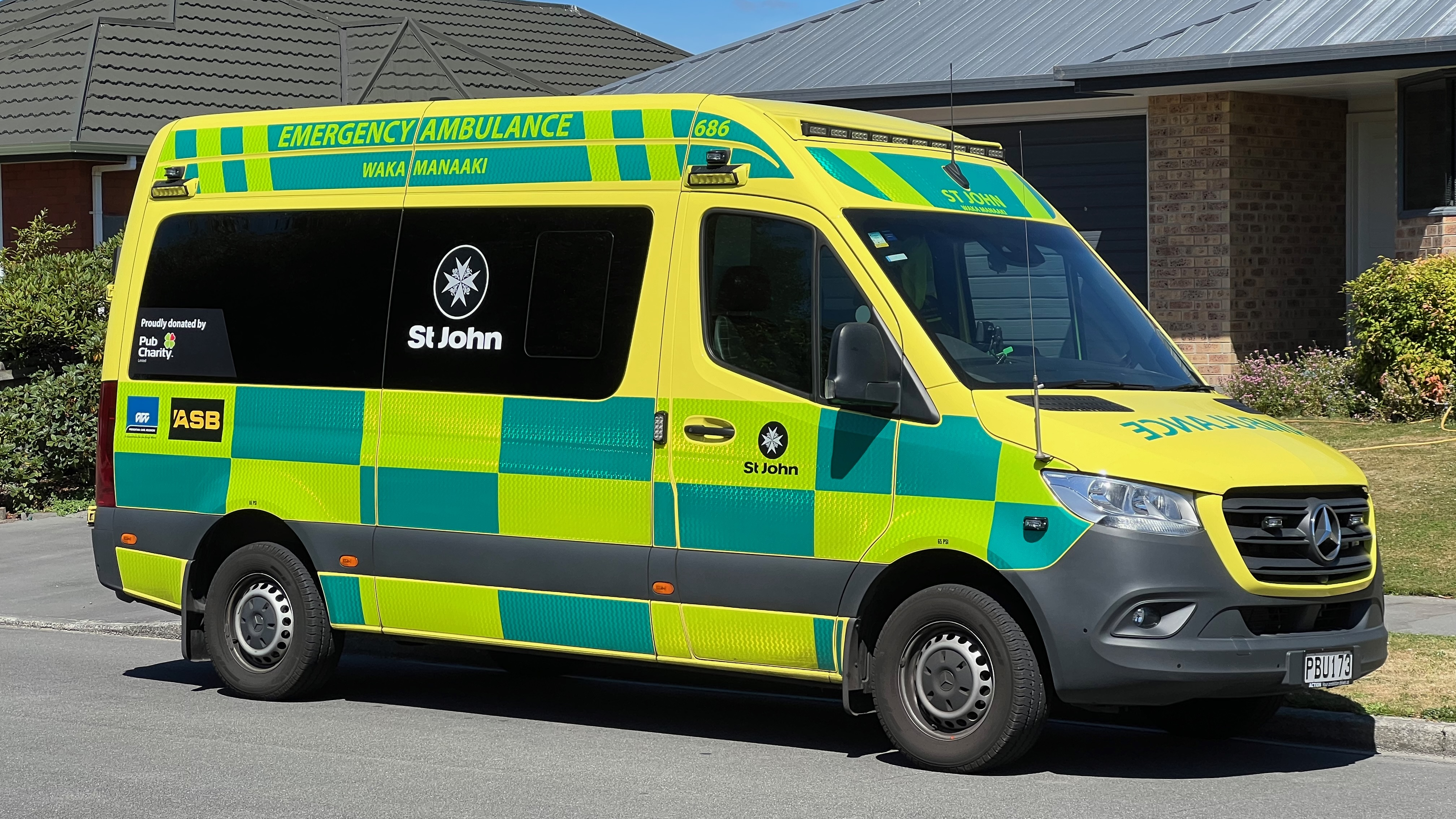
Hato Hone St John Emergency Ambulance

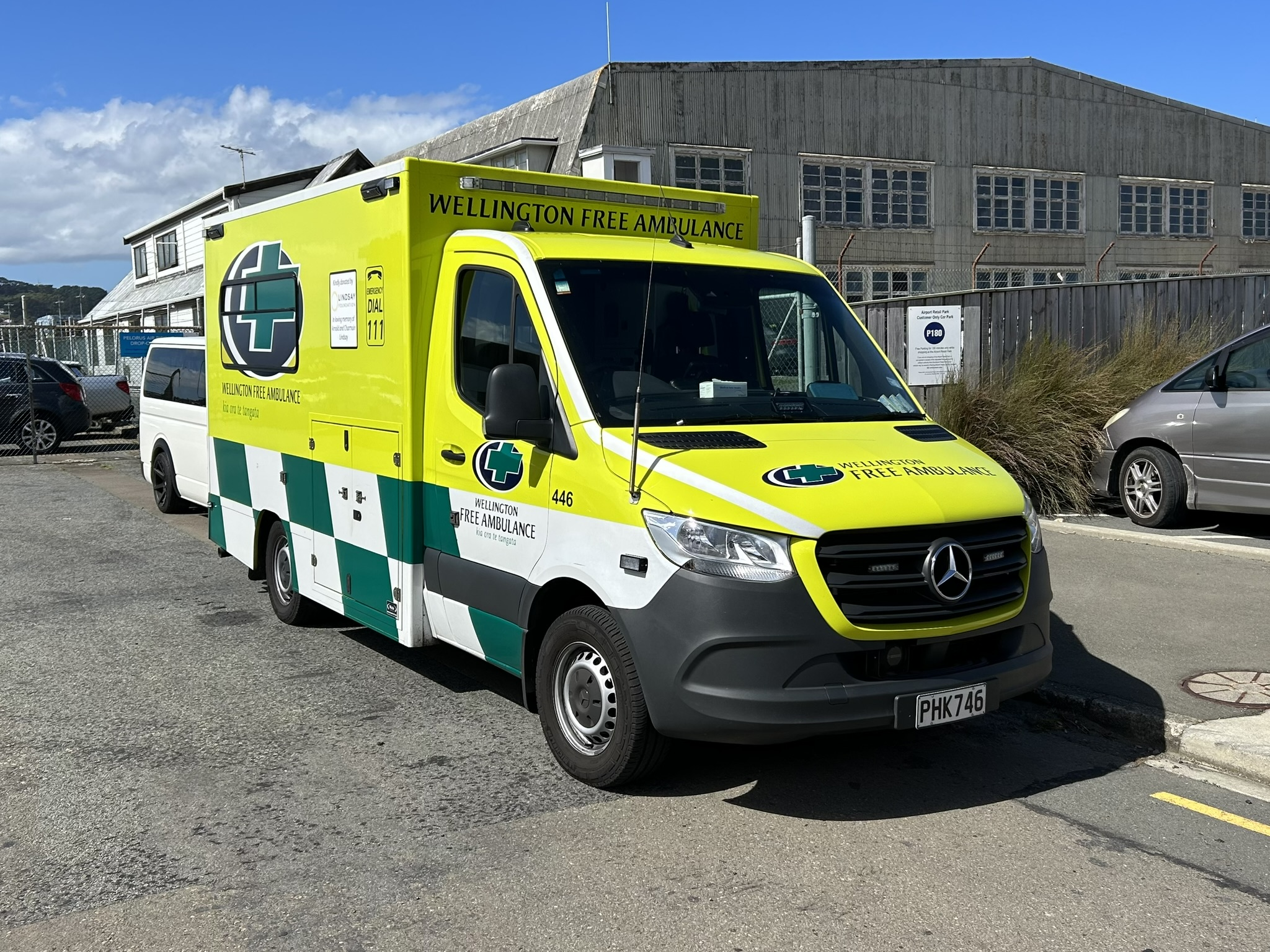
Wellington Free Ambulance Emergency Ambulance Service

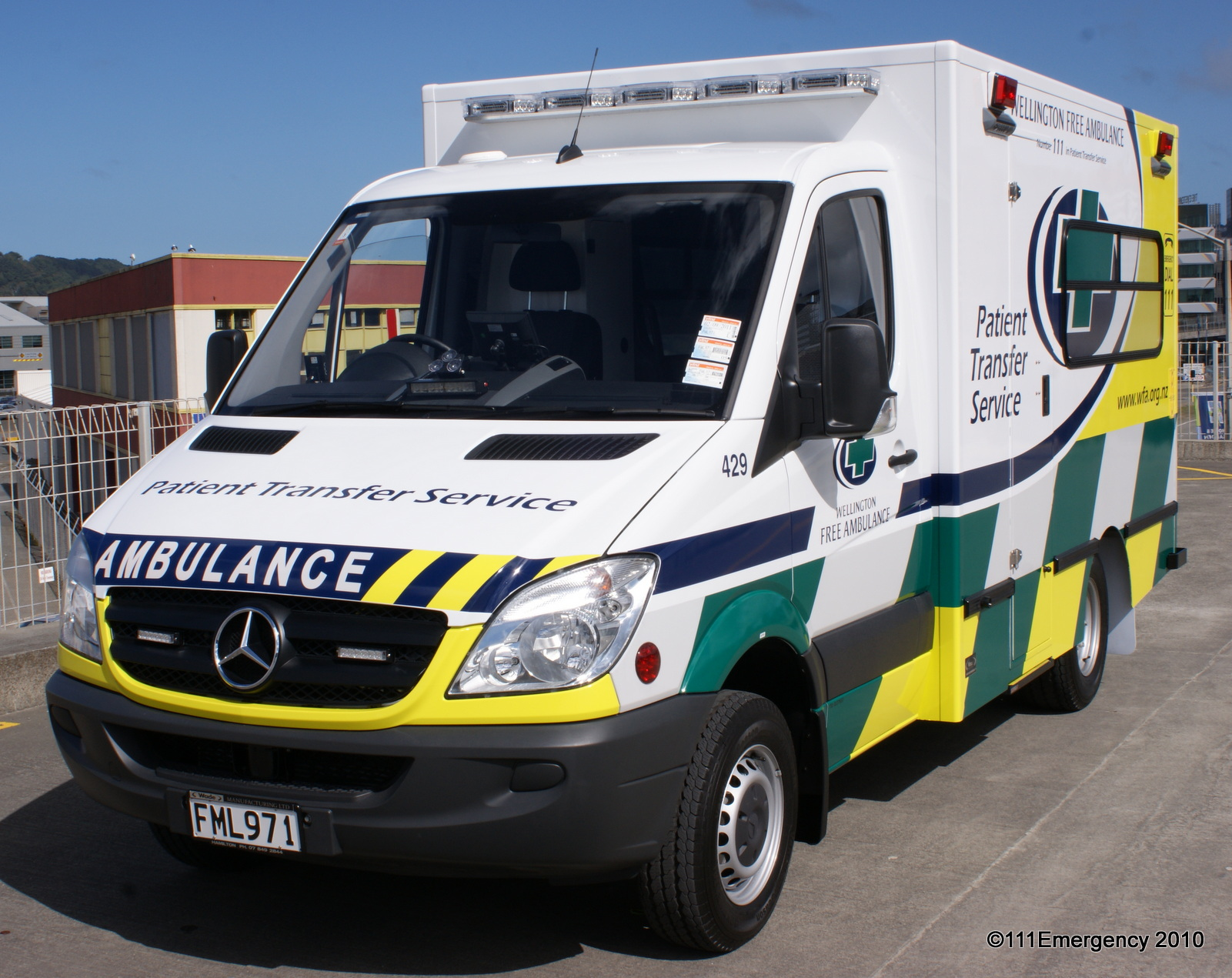
Wellington Free Ambulance Patient Transfer Service

=== Air ambulance ===
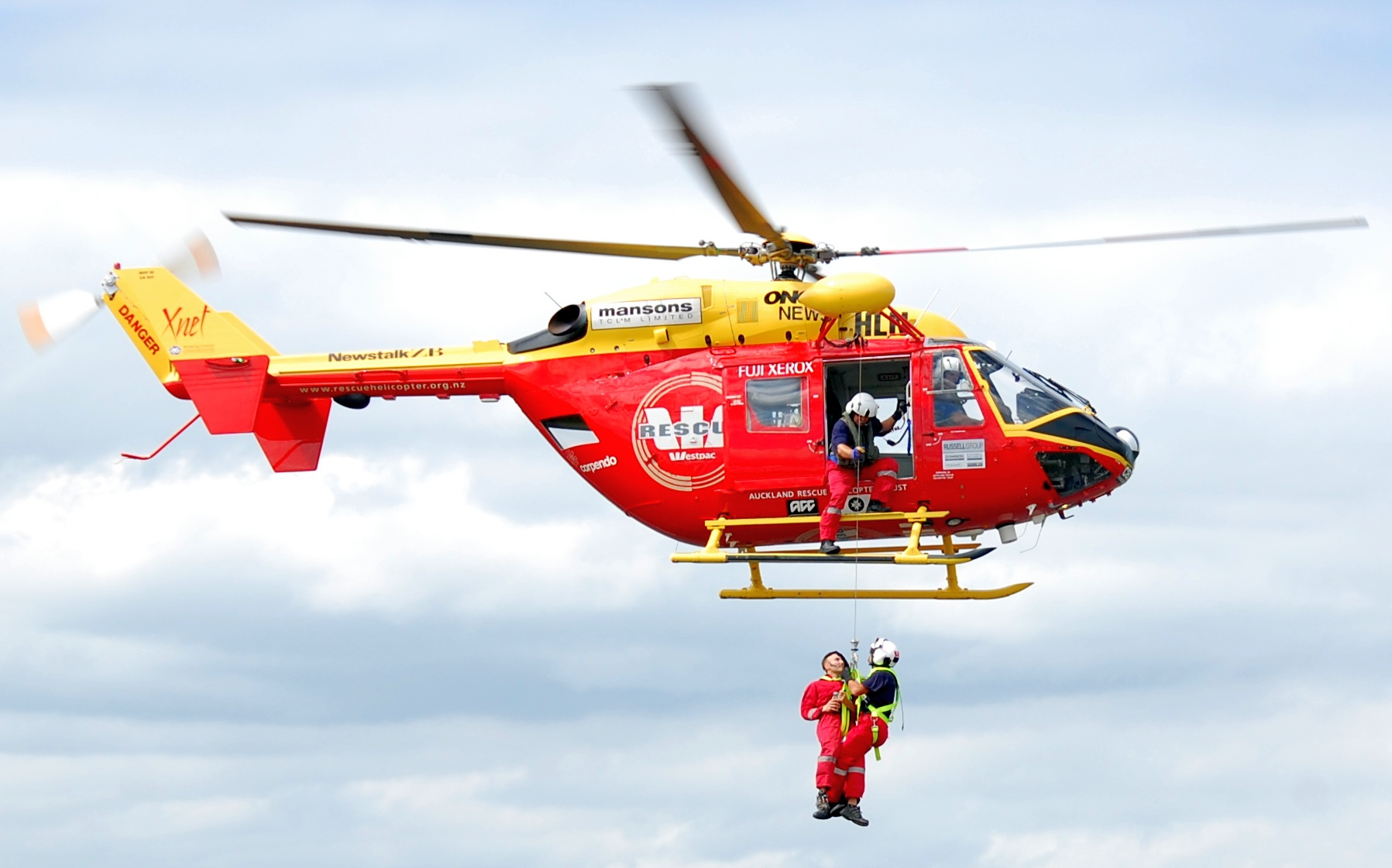
Westpac Rescue Helicopter during a demonstration in 2009

Auckland Rescue Helicopter and Hato Hone St John Ambulance at Hamilton Airport

Air ambulance and helicopter rescue services are vital given the low population density of New Zealand and the significant distances between tertiary hospitals. There are three organisations contracted to operate air ambulance helicopters; this could be reduced to just one in 2025. Each is owned by various location organisations that operate the helicopters. Covering the upper North Island is Northern Rescue Helicopter Ltd, owned by Northland Emergency Services Trust, and Auckland Rescue Helicopter Trust. The rest of North Island is covered by Central Air Ambulance Rescue Limited (CAARL), which is owned by five regional charitable Trusts. Helicopter Emergency Medical Services Ltd (HEMS), covers the whole of South Island, it is owned by GCH aviation and HeliOtago. The New Zealand government funds $140m that covers most, but not all, of the air ambulance costs. The remaining costs are covered by fundraising from charitable trusts. Most of the trusts or individual helicopters are sponsored by a commercial entity and bear its name for marketing purposes; for example Auckland, Waikato, Wellington and Christchurch helicopters are sponsored by the Westpac Banking Corporation and branded as "Westpac Rescue" while others include the Taranaki Energy Rescue Helicopter, Eastland Helicopter Rescue Trust (EHRT), Bay Trust Rescue Helicopter, etc. Clinical crew (typically Intensive Care Paramedics) for the helicopters are full time employed Intensive Care Paramedics.

Domestic fixed wing air ambulance and patient transfers services, are provided by four organisations. Skyline Aviation, that is supports Starship Hospital. Life Flight Trust that is part of CAARL for its rescue helicopter service. GCH Aviation operates flying doctor service. Stewart Island Flights are also used for patient transfers. Typically use pressurised and converted Fairchild Metro aircraft, equipped as flying Intensive Care units. and it has been estimated that after corporate sponsorship and government subsidy, it is necessary to raise approximately NZ$2,500 (around US$1,400 in 2009) in donations for each mission.

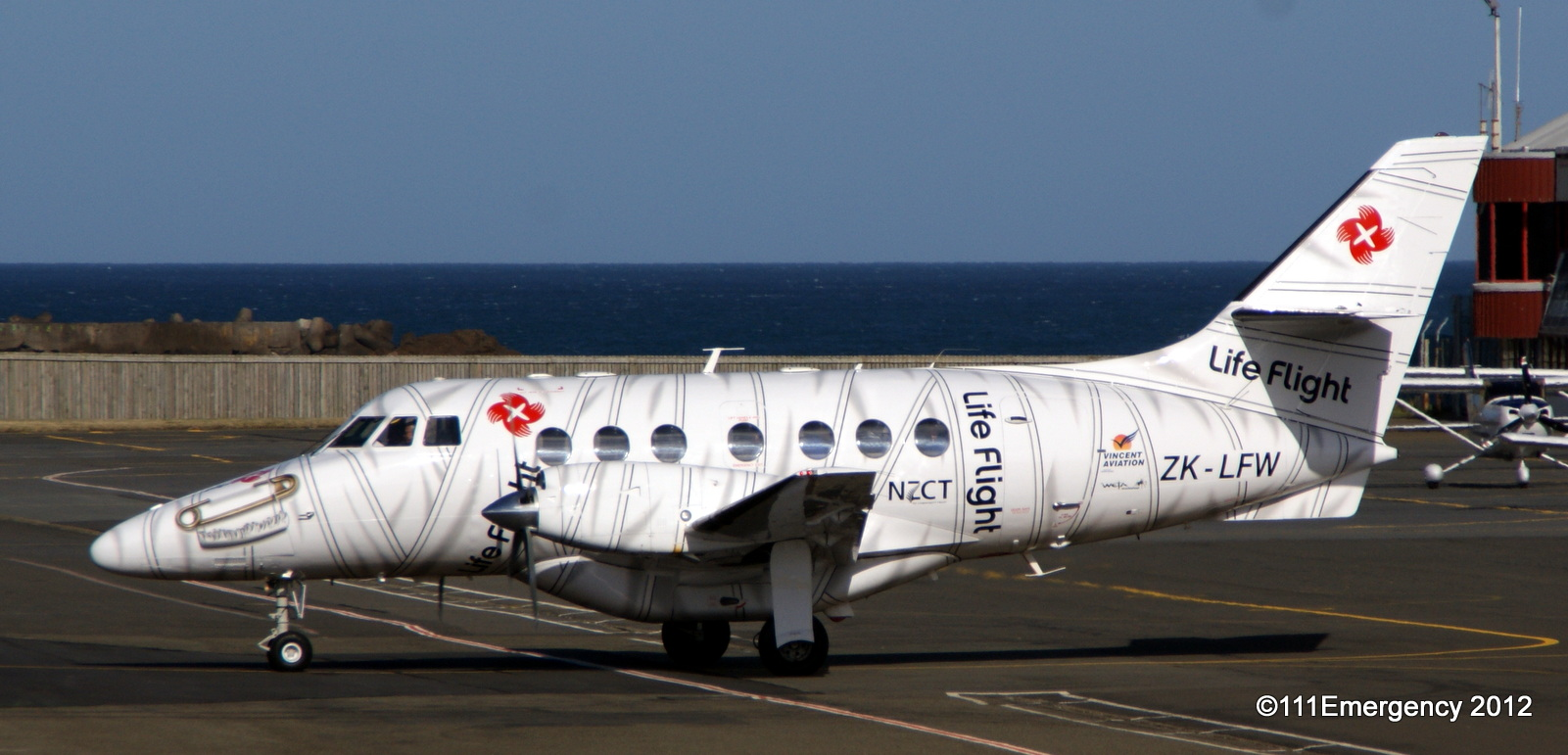
Life Flight Trust Air Ambulance – ZK-LFW – Jetstream

=== Fire and Emergency New Zealand ===
Fire and Emergency New Zealand (FENZ) provides a medical 'First Response' in smaller communities where there is no local ambulance service. These fire personnel are trained to a higher standard than regular firefighters and are equipped with basic ambulance equipment.

As of Christmas 2013, FENZ 'Co- Responds' to all "Code Purple" (typically cardiac or respiratory arrest) emergencies St John Ambulance and Wellington Free Ambulance attends nationwide. The standard FENZ response to a medical emergency is one fire appliance equipped with an automated external defibrillator and oxygen therapy kit.

=== Military ===
The New Zealand Defence Force has personnel and equipment available at short notice to assist in civilian matters including medical emergencies.

=== Models of care ===
The New Zealand system functions on the Anglo-American model of care, with most care in the pre-hospital setting being conducted by paramedics. Other practitioners, including local physicians and midwives, do appear at calls from time to time, but spend much less time responding to emergency calls than the Franco-German model. The Royal New Zealand College of Urgent Care (RNZCUC) oversees urgent care practitioners in New Zealand.

== Clinical Education ==
The clinical education of Ambulance staff in New Zealand historically draws parallels to the Anglo-American development of the Paramedic profession generally but has undergone radical transformation in the past decade closely mirroring developments pursued by nations such as Australia, South Africa, Canada and the United Kingdom.

=== Historical (pre-1977) ===
Prior to 1977 the "training" of Ambulance Officers was arranged in an ad-hoc fashion to a varying degree of first aid preparation to enable passage of a national examination administered on behalf of the Department of Health by an Examination Board of the Order of St John; a requirement established by the Ambulance Transport Advisory Board in 1963. Despite the content of this examination being described as "very basic" the requirement for some degree of formal Ambulance Officer education and training is one of the earliest in the world; in contrast the Ambulance Service of New South Wales established the Ambulance Education Centre at Rozelle (Sydney) in 1961 – although the first graduates were not until 1966, Geelong & Districts Ambulance in Victoria (Australia) began a training school in 1962 and the province of Ontario (Canada) implemented a requirement for a five-week, 160-hour "Fundamentals of Casualty Care" course for ambulance attendants in 1967.

Into the 1970s there was considerable development of local training amongst ambulance services over-and-above the basic DOH/ATAB requirement; this training particularly focused on defibrillation to treat cardiac arrest and was most notable in Christchurch, Wellington and Auckland; with Auckland introducing the first Mobile Intensive Care (Life Support Unit) on the North Shore in 1970 however other subjects covered included the administration of entonox (nitrous oxide) for pain relief and the taking of a patient's blood pressure. The introduction of out-of-hospital defibrillation by civilian Paramedics to New Zealand (1970) is again among the earliest examples in the world; predated only by the original 1966 Pantridge Experiment in Belfast (Northern Ireland) and its earliest direct replication projects by the Miami Fire Department ("Rescue 1" in March 1967 under Dr. Eugene Nagel) and New York City with the Mobile Coronary Care Unit established by Dr. William Grace of St. Vincents Hospital) also introduced in 1967.

=== National Ambulance Officers Training School (1977–1999) ===
The National Ambulance Officers Training School (NAOTS) was established in 1977 using funds raised from the earlier 1975 Telethon and was administered by the Auckland Centre Trust Board of the St John Ambulance Association to fulfill its requirement to the Government (through the Ambulance Transport Advisory Board) to establish a national system of training for Ambulance Officers. NAOTS formalised training into three distinct levels of "Ambulance Aid" with each was a Certificate issued jointly by the Department of Health (through the ATAB) and the National Training School under the auspices of the Order of St John.

- Basic grade certification as either six weeks full-time for paid officers or taught in two three-week blocks for volunteers over two years (three weeks each year) provided they had completed at least 400 hours of service in the year prior to commencing and in the year between blocks.
- Intermediate Aid consisted of six pre-course correspondence assignments, a two-week block course and two weeks of in-hospital experience. The initial provisions of the Intermediate Aid course were nebulised salbutamol, MAST and intravenous fluid administration.
- Advanced Aid built upon Intermediate Aid and required a minimum of three years' service. The fourteen-week course was spread over a five-week block course, four weeks each of in-hospital and on-road and then a one-week examining period. Once qualified in Advanced Aid (as a "Paramedic") an Officer could perform defibrillation, intubation, chest decompression and administer a number of drugs.

Walton and Offenberger compiled a review of the NAOTS (and Ambulance Officer training generally) for the Department of Health in 1984 which led to the following reforms:

- The School became affiliated with the (then) Auckland Institute of Technology (now AUT) and relocating out of the old Central Ambulance Station in Pitt St to the Akoranga Campus in 1990.
- Elementary Ambulance Aid was introduced to provide a national first step for volunteers
- The "Basic Grade Certificate in Ambulance Aid" was renamed "Proficiency Ambulance Aid"
- Intermediate Aid was changed to form two "Post-Proficiency Modules" one in Monitoring/Defibrillation and the other Intravenous Therapy.
- Medical treatment protocols for Intermediate and Advanced Aid became the responsibility of the Ambulance Transport Advisory Board (later the New Zealand Ambulance Board) as they had initially been developed by the NAOTS however this was seen to be unsatisfactory as it was deemed a responsibility of the medical profession whereas NAOTS was an educational body.

The review also consideration the necessity of using qualified Ambulance Officers when undertaking non-emergency transfer duties; this can be seen today as the Patient Transport Service whereby transfers of nonemergency patients between hospitals, clinics and home are provided by staff who have only minimal clinical training (First Responder) as this is the need dictated by their duties. It was recommended that the Ambulance qualifications offered through NAOTS be recognised by the Authority for Advanced Vocational Awards (AAVA).

With the Bolger led National Government reforms of the 1990s; the New Zealand Qualifications Authority was established to replace the AAVA and by 1996 the NAOTS certifications were shifted onto the newly established Nationals Qualifications Framework thus became formal vocational qualifications of higher learning. Proficiency Ambulance Aid was replaced by the National Certificate in Ambulance (Patient Care and Transport) while the National Diploma in Ambulance (Paramedic) replaced both Post-Proficiency Modules (Intermediate Aid) as well as Advanced Aid however in practice the Intermediate Aid qualification was still offered as two Unit Standards from the Diploma.

The National Training School closed in 1999 as it had "become dysfunctional" and the recently introduced Ambulance Education Council considered that a drive towards regional service-led training was best thus began a decade of inconsistency within clinical education, although not as great as to return to the pre-NAOTS era of splintification.

=== Post NAOTS (1999–2008) ===
Following closure of the National Training School and disbanding of the New Zealand Ambulance Board which had previously published the National Authorised Patient Care Procedures each service took on responsibility for its own clinical education and standing orders (patient care procedures) which would further aggravate regional differences and ultimately, help lead a return to nationalised clinical education.

In 1999 a programme of "Intermediate Care Upskilling" was introduced by St John (initially in the Auckland District) to equip selected ICOs with adrenaline, morphine, naloxone and (at the time) metoclopramide. This distinct training package was not part of any formal qualification. St John also merged the two Post-Proficiency modules back into one education programme at some point during this time so that an officer became qualified in both portions of Intermediate Aid concurrently. Wellington Free Ambulance chose to adhere to the original Post-Proficiency module design thus retaining two distinct practice levels (cardiac and IV/cardiac). They also developed their own upskilling programme known as "advanced life support" consisting of two modules, A and B; module A contained cardiac arrest drugs (at the time adrenaline, atropine and lignocaine) while Module B provided intravenous pain relief along with naloxone and metoclopramide.

To coincide with introduction of the various upskilling packages in the early 2000s there was a move away from the once nationally consistent qualification titles (Ambulance Officer, Intermediate Care Officer, Advanced Care Officer (Paramedic)) that existed under the National Training School to the introduction of new titles into each of the services. St John renamed Intermediate Care Officer to "Paramedic" and Paramedic (ACO) to "Advanced Paramedic" in 2001 along with a new national uniform. Wellington Free Ambulance chose to rename all staff qualified at National Certificate (Proficiency) or Intermediate Aid to "Paramedic" and their Paramedics (ACOs) to "Intensive Care Paramedic". There is anecdotal suggestion that the renaming of staff who did not hold the full National Diploma/Advanced Aid to "Paramedic" was due in part to the high media profile of programs such as Third Watch and Rescue 911 which glorified and glamorised the role of "Paramedic" thus giving the public an expectation that they, as on TV, should be attended to by a "Paramedic". It has also been recorded that the move to rename Intermediate Care Officer to "Paramedic" on the part of St John was somewhat motivated by their desire to expedite contract negotiations with the Ministry of Health and ACC which required a certain number of "Paramedics" however it can be logically assumed that the contract did not actually define what a "Paramedic" was, as the original definition of a Paramedic in New Zealand was somebody qualified to National Diploma/Advanced Care level.

With the demise of NAOTS; Auckland Institute of Technology, having been awarded University status and renamed Auckland University of Technology, developed the Bachelor of Health Science (Paramedic) degree while Victoria University (Melbourne) partnered with Wellington Free Ambulance to create a tertiary Paramedic degree administered through Whitireia Community Polytechnic. In 2003 St John began to require completion of the Bachelor of Health Science (Paramedic) for those staff who wished to move to the Advanced Life Support (Advanced Aid) qualification level. Wellington Free introduced an "Intern Paramedic" position in 2004 to accommodate staff who would completing the Degree while also working on the road at the same time.

By the late 2000s there was a need to once again bring reform to clinical education; and although not as marked as those introduced during the time of the National Training School the following issues needed urgent attention

- Introduction of tertiary degrees and the apparent double standard this created compared to more technically focussed vocational qualifications centred around a narrow scope of knowledge; coupled to this the ongoing viability of NZQA Unit Standards as a realistic platform to deliver comprehensive paramedic education (many felt they had outlived their useful life for higher practice levels)
- Moves by comparative jurisdictions in Australia totally towards tertiary education only
- The lack of a distinct qualification for the intermediate tier practitioner; originally the Certificate in Intermediate Aid was awarded upon completion of the ICO course however with the introduction of the National Certificate and Diploma in 1995 there was no longer a distinct external qualification for this level and this was even more true for the "upskilled" provider as this was an internally run course
- The need for structured ongoing clinical education once a qualification had been gained
- The very low completion rate of the National Certificate by volunteers (19%) when considering the goal of NAOTS had been to qualify all Ambulance Officers to the "basic" level (originally Proficiency but later National Certificate)
- Increasing complexity of ambulance practice beyond "scoop and run" and early Paramedic practice focussing mainly on early defibrillation/cardiac arrest and trauma care
- Increasing chronic disease,
- Impracticality of delivering all patients to a hospital emergency department, particularly in the face of increasing chronic disease or mental health problems which are not ideally handled in an acute presentation to ED.
- Increasing public expectation (see above)
- Inconsistency between service providers' levels of practice and the requirements of a newly introduced Ambulance Sector Standard which defined three levels of practice (discussed below)
- The long-held view (since 1993) that Paramedics should be registered health practitioners in their own right.

The 2007 Health Select Committee report into the provision of ambulance services and the resulting National Ambulance Service Strategy included requirements to "achieve national consistency" in ambulance education and scope of practice (clinical competency). St John had during this time developed a draft "Operations Competency Framework" which would become the foundation of more recent developments; specifically the replacement of the National Certificate, the requirement for all the various intermediate level officers to transition to a new "Paramedic" level which would approximate the "Upskilled Paramedic (ALS-A/ALS-B)" levels and become a Degree course, the development<refof a Post-Graduate programme for Advanced Life Support (Advanced Aid) and the introduction of a mandatory programme of continuing clinical education.

=== Current system (2008-present) ===
==== National Diploma ====
In 2008 the National Diploma in Ambulance Practice (Level 5) replaced the National Certificate in Ambulance Patient Care and Transport (Level 4) as the qualification for the basic life support level.

The National Diploma is required to be referred to as an EMT (Emergency Medical Technician).

The Diploma is a "blended" learning programme comprising approximately 1,300 hours of online and in-class learning plus on-road clinical experiences. There are three modules (core skills, medical and trauma) which each have an online component prior to classroom education and this theoretical component is run concurrently while a student is practicing in the operation environment thus building the requisite base of experience to become a qualified Ambulance Officer.

- Core Skills (four weeks online and 2 days in-class) covering scene assessment, primary/secondary survey and vital signs, resuscitation, defibrillation
- Trauma (six weeks online and 6 days in-class) covering trauma and anatomy, shock and anaphylaxis, chest injuries, soft tissue injuries, environmental, head and spine
- Medical (six weeks online and 6 days in-class) covering cardiac and respiratory, children's health, pregnancy, childbirth and newborns, older persons health, abdominal, diabetes, stroke, seizures, altered levels of consciousness, scene management, mental health

While the format of the qualification has changed significantly in the move to predominantly online learning that the actual content of has not been reduced; if anything it has increased considering the National Certificate had twenty-eight credits at level 5 whereas the Diploma has one hundred and eleven. The number (and focus) of classroom days have been changed due to the majority of theoretical learning taking place online and classroom days heavily focussing on the psychomotor aspects of ambulance practice rather than teaching and assessing anatomy, physiology and pathology in great detail.

During (and after) the online and class phases of National Diploma the student must complete a Portfolio of Evidence for presentation at the End of Course Interview and Assessment. The Portfolio requires the student to demonstrate integrated clinical practice as well as self-reflection/professional development through skill logs, mentor reports and exemplars.

==== Degree ====
A Bachelor's degree in Paramedicine (Level 7) is set to be required nationally for the intermediate life support level as of 2014. While it has essentially become the de facto standard for entry to the profession St John still offer an internal ILS course for currently practicing paid staff who wish to move to the ILS level from either the old Paramedic level (intermediate aid) or the BLS level (Certificate or Diploma). The Degree was scheduled for introduction by the beginning of 2012 however it is understood that there have been delays in assembling a realistic framework to transition totally away from an in-service education model.

The degree is required to be referred to as a Paramedic.

The degree is a comprehensive education programme over three years consisting of 3,600 hours of learning, which enables students to build a solid foundation of knowledge, skill and clinical judgement to the ILS level as a mixture of classroom, simulation suite and practical (on-road) experience. This caters to both school leavers who wish to pursue a Paramedic career (in the same way at other health professional degrees), and also for working Ambulance Officers who wish to upgrade their knowledge and obtain a tertiary qualification.

There were previously suggestions by St John that the organisation may follow Western Australia, the Northern Territory and the Ambulance Service of New South Wales by offering employment at a defined exit point of the Degree allowing the student to essentially become a BLS Emergency Medical Technician full-time and complete the rest of the degree over a number of years and qualify as an ILS Paramedic. This pathway appears to no longer be being considered.

==== Postgraduate Certificate ====
A Postgraduate Certificate (Level 8) is, as of 2013, the required qualification to reach ALS level (known as Intensive Care Paramedic) and is offered by AUT as the Postgraduate Certificate in Emergency Management or Whitireia as the Postgraduate Certificate in Specialty Care (Advanced Paramedic Practice).

The Postgraduate Certificate is required to be referred to as an ICP (Intensive Care Paramedic).

The focus of this qualification is to build upon the Paramedics' knowledge and skillset to deliver advanced resuscitation interventions such as intubation, rapid sequence induction, chest decompression, thrombolysis and pacing as well as developing more advanced capability in clinical leadership and decision-making.

== Clinical Practice ==
The revised New Zealand Ambulance and Paramedical Service Standard (NZS8156:2008) defines three levels of practice and gives guidance as to their depth and breadth but it does not however define the specific interventions to be included in each (scope of practice). The specific scopes of practice are set every two years as part of the Clinical Practice Guidelines developed by the Clinical Working Group (part of Ambulance New Zealand) which consists of the medical directors, medical advisors and paramedic representatives from both St John and Wellington Free Ambulance as well as the New Zealand Defence Force.

Although the standard is more or less correct, there are aspects of practice which have evolved since it was written. ECG interpretation is a good example, where in-depth 12 lead ECG interpretation is now taught at ILS level as part of the degree where at the time of writing the Standard (2008) this level of skill was generally reserved for ALS practitioners given the number of practicing graduates was smaller at that time.

Like other similar systems around the world such as South Africa, the UK and Australia, and in sharp polar contrast to the United States and (to a lesser degree) Canada, the system of practice is entirely based upon the professional discretion of the attending ambulance officers, and there is no need for "online medical direction" to obtain approval for drugs or procedures. There is however a strong system of collegial support via the communications centre Clinical Desk (and on-call Medical Advisors) to assist with clinical decision-making when required, this however is not a system of seeking permission.

The below Delegated Scopes of Practice are as per the 2013–2015 Clinical Procedures and Guidelines

=== First responder ===
Basic pre-hospital emergency care (PHEC) level used for non Ambulance work (such as Events and non emergency transfers (PTS)) as well as community first response in rural areas, as an initial starting point for those on the clinical education pathway (i.e. completing the Diploma or above) or where the standard education pathway has been found unsuitable for a volunteer. This level does not have an "authority to practice" and does not independently utilise the Clinical Practice Guidelines or many pieces of clinical equipment. Some medications can be used by staff in the entry level of ambulance care (event staff and new volunteers).

Current scope of practice: Paracetamol, ibuprofen, aspirin, oxygen therapy, intermittent positive pressure ventilation (IPPV), oropharyngeal airway (OPA), nasopharyngeal airway (NPA). Additionally, certain medications from the EMT scope of practice may be given by a First Responder with Clinical Direction from an EMT/Paramedic/ICP at the scene or via the St John/WFA Clinical Desk.

=== Emergency Medical Technician ===
General pre-hospital emergency care to assess and manage both life-threatening and non-life-threatening situations using knowledge, skills and clinical judgement appropriate to generally non-invasive techniques and non-intravenous drug regimens.

Current scope of practice: 3/12 lead ECG acquisition, nasopharyngeal airway, nebulised salbutamol, nebulised ipratropium, GTN (sublingual only), IM glucagon, laryngeal mask airway, ondansetron (intramuscular), loratadine, Ibuprofen, Methoxyflurane, PEEP valve, adrenaline (IM, IN, nebulised, and topical), Prednisone, Prednisolone, Tramadol, urinary catheter troubleshooting, laryngoscopy, Magill forceps.

=== Paramedic ===
The knowledge and skills required to provide invasive care significantly extend beyond basic life support (BLS), including greater clinical judgement and the use of a wider range of pharmacological treatments.

Current scope of practice: All of the above plus manual defibrillation, synchronised cardioversion, IV cannulation, IV fluid administration, IV glucose, morphine, fentanyl, naloxone, ondansetron, adrenaline (IV) for cardiac arrest, amiodarone (IV) for cardiac arrest, ceftriaxone, midazolam (IM) for seizures, oxytocin, clopidogrel, lignocaine (SC) for ring blocks.

=== Intensive Care Paramedic ===
Legacy qualification which was used until 2022 to provide advanced management where knowledge, rationale, judgement, skill and leadership are professionally developed and utilizes comprehensive regime of pharmacology, airway support and ECG interpretation.

Providers at the ICP level have been trained to move to the Extended Care Paramedic pathway or the Critical Care Paramedic pathway.

=== Extended Care Paramedic ===
Extended Care Paramedics work to their own Clinical Procedures and Guidelines and provide advanced non-emergent skills such as advanced suturing or providing at home packs of antibiotics to prevent the need for a patient to be transported to a hospital or follow-up with their General Practitioner.

See: ecpcpg_comprehensive_211208.pdf

=== Critical Care Paramedic ===
This is the scope of practice many ICP Paramedics moved to when ICPs retrained to ECP to CCP paramedics in 2020.

They have the highest clinical scope in pre-hospital care. Their services include EMTs, Paramedics, ICPs, plus advanced critical care procedures, stronger drugs, and intensive life support including in-field Rapid sequence intubation (RSI) with full critical care sedation and paralysis.

See: Authority to Practise and Practice Levels CPG EAS 1.1 | NZ CPG

== Registration ==
The Trustees of Ambulance New Zealand submitted an application to the Minister of Health in June 2011 that requested Paramedic and Intensive Care Paramedic be included as registered health professions. Paramedic registration in New Zealand was formally established on January 1, 2020, under the Health Practitioners Competence Assurance Act 2003, with Te Kaunihera Manapou Paramedic Council established as the regulator. While the profession became regulated in 2020, actual registration applications opened in March 2021.

See: https://paramediccouncil.org.nz/PCNZ/_Web/Public/News/Paramedic-Registration-Update.aspx

According to the Health Practitioners Competency Assurance Act, a responsible authority (RA) assumes control for governing paramedic practice in New Zealand so that practitioners would enforce this professional body, thus resulting in a significant change from the current "employer led" regulation.

== Communications ==
The EMS system in New Zealand is served by three dispatch centres, located in Auckland, Wellington, and Christchurch. The dispatch centre in Christchurch provides coverage to the entire South Island, and is operated by Hato Hone St John Ambulance. The dispatch centre in Auckland provides coverage for the north half of North Island, and is also operated by Hato Hone St John Ambulance. The dispatch centre in Wellington provides coverage for the southern half of the North Island, is jointly operated by Wellington Free Ambulance and St John Ambulance but is staffed by Wellington Free Ambulance personnel. All three dispatch centres collaborate, and are capable of handling overflow of call volume for one another. The communication centre technology is fully integrated and seamless, providing a single, 'virtual' national dispatch centre. To illustrate, if an emergency has occurred in Christchurch but those 111 lines are all busy, the call will be forwarded to the dispatch centres in either Auckland or Wellington. The call will be answered, information gathered, and placed into the computer network. It will then appear as a pending call on the desk of the appropriate dispatcher in Christchurch, all seamlessly.

The national emergency number for ambulances in New Zealand is 111. The three dispatch centres also include significant advanced technologies, including AMPDS and Siren software for the triaging and assignment of calls. They also include a nationwide network of Automatic Vehicle Location (AVL), showing the location and current status of every ambulance in the country. All dispatchers in New Zealand are certified Emergency Medical Dispatchers (EMDs), and meet the international standard for that qualification. Between them, the ambulance dispatch centres process approximately 300,000 calls per year originating with the 111 system. They also process an additional 800,000 calls per year from GPs, hospitals requesting transfers, medical alarm monitoring companies, and from paramedics themselves.

The telephone triage system used within the communication centres is the internationally regarded Advanced Priority Medical Dispatch System also known as ProQA whereby the caller is interrogated to determine the most appropriate problem detriment to guide the level of response in terms of speed and clinical capability.

| Colour | Classification |
|---|---|
| Purple | Cardiac or respiratory arrest |
| Red | Immediately life-threatening |
| Orange | Urgent and potentially serious |
| Green | Neither urgent nor serious |
| Grey | Telephone triage appropriate |

== Professional Body ==
Paramedics Australasia is the peak professional body representing paramedics throughout New Zealand and Australia www.paramedics.org. Established in New Zealand in October 2011, Paramedics Australasia provides representation on professional paramedic issues, advocacy before government, and responds to media comment on professional paramedic issues. Paramedics Australasia sponsors the annual New Zealand national paramedic conference (SPANZ - in conjunction with Student Paramedics Australasia) which alternates between AUT University in Auckland and Whitireia Polytechnic in Wellington.

== See also ==
- Wellington Free Ambulance
- Hato Hone St John
