= Life Flight (New Zealand) =

New Zealand air ambulance charity

Life Flight Trust
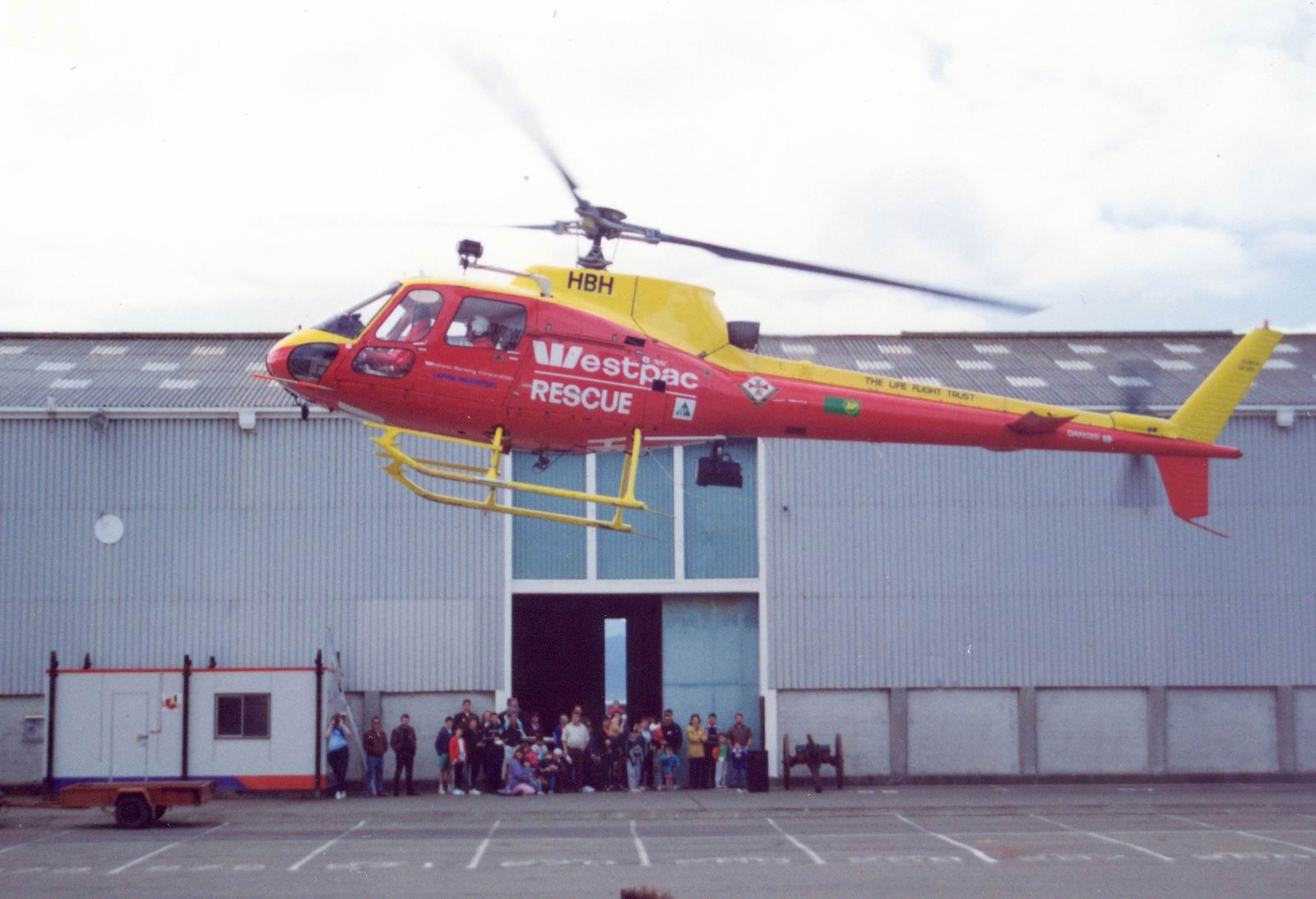
- Westpac Rescue Helicopter
- Formation: 1982
- Founder: Peter Button
- Type: Nonprofit
- Purpose: Resue helicopter service
- Headquarters: 17 George Bolt Street, Rongotai, Wellington 6022
- Location: Wellington, New Zealand
- Official language: English
- Chief Executive: Mark Johnston
- Expenses: $17.6M NZD (2024)
- Website: https://www.lifeflight.org.nz/

Life Flight, or Life Flight Trust, is a charitable trust providing an emergency air ambulance and rescue helicopter service that operates out of Wellington, New Zealand. Their services include the Wellington-based H145 Westpac Rescue Helicopter, as well as five nationwide Beechcraft King Air 200C Air Ambulance planes that transport patients who are critically ill and in need of hospital transfer for specialist care. The majority of patients are from the central or lower North Island, or the upper South Island of New Zealand.

== History ==
In 1975, Peter Button and Dr Russell Worth launched The Life Flight Trust, which by 2025 would go on to help over 40,000 New Zealanders.

== Equipment ==
=== Westpac Rescue Helicopter ===
The Westpac Rescue Helicopter is an H145 emergency air rescue service which operates out of Wellington Hospital. It is used primarily for search and rescue but may also be used for police and bomb squad operations, or in firefighting. The helicopter often rescues car accident victims, injured trampers stranded in the bush, or performs rescues in other areas which are a considerable distance from any nearby hospital.

Life Flight is partially government funded. For each mission, $4000 NZD must be raised from the community. These donations are provided by individuals and companies across New Zealand.

=== Air ambulance ===
Life Flight's J32 Jetstream air ambulance, ZK-LFW, replaced their older Metroliner plane in 2012. A second aircraft of the same type, ZK-LFT, was purchased in 2017 to meet rising demand. Both carry patients between hospitals around New Zealand to receive specialist medical care. The service flies an average of four emergency trips to hospitals around New Zealand per day. In November 2023, Life Flight announced that they were purchasing three Beechcraft King Air 200C aircraft from the Royal Flying Doctors Service to replace their two J32 Jetstream aircraft. Life Flight now operate five King Air aircraft.

Pilot Ian Pirie commented that flying patients by air presents unique challenges, such as ensuring soft landings for patients with spinal injuries, or flying very low with patients with brain or diving injuries. He commented that calls involving premature babies were often the most rewarding, as he was often able to see how much they had grown when later flying them home after weeks in hospital incubators. The plane is even equipped to deliver babies on board, if necessary.

In 2024, Life Flight set up an operating base at Hamilton Airport, with one aircraft being located at the airport. In 2026, the base was officially opened by Life Flight CEO Mark Johnston and Minister of Health Simeon Brown, a second aircraft was announced to be based in Hamilton at the same time.

== Charity fundraising ==
As Life Flight Trust is a charitable trust, it receives funding through donations. Community fundraisers to raise funds for the service are often organised by individuals or groups such as Westpac bank, or other local clubs and organisations.

Other fundraising events are often put on by Life Flight itself and funds are also raised by word of mouth, online donations, and telemarketing. Due to the service's high-profile among New Zealand's rescue services, other lower profile services such as the Taranaki Air Ambulance and the Nelson Marlborough Rescue Helicopter Trust have been confused for the service, and sometimes miss out on donations as a result.

== TV show ==
Life Flight was the subject of a reality TV documentary show in 2013 that ran for 10 episodes. A second season ran in 2016, also running for 10 episodes.

== See also ==
- Auckland Rescue Helicopter Trust
- Northland Emergency Services Trust
- Otago Rescue Helicopter Trust
- Piha Surf Life Saving Club
