= Westpac Rescue Helicopter =

Westpac Rescue Helicopter can refer to:

- Westpac Life Saver Rescue Helicopter Service, Australia
- Westpac Rescue Helicopter (New Zealand), New Zealand
