= Otago Rescue Helicopter Trust =

Otago Southland Rescue Helicopter Trust

Otago Southland Rescue Helicopter Trust
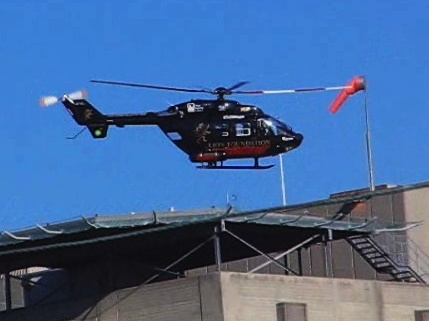
- Otago Rescue Helicopter takeoff Dunedin Public Hospital
- Formation: 1998
- Type: Nonprofit
- Purpose: Emergency Service
- Location: Dunedin, New Zealand
- Official language: English
- Website: http://www.otagorescue.co.nz/

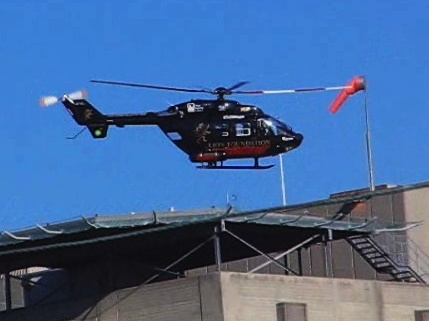
The Otago Regional Rescue Helicopter taking off from Dunedin Hospital in 2007

The Otago Rescue Helicopter trust is an emergency helicopter service covering the lower South Island area of New Zealand, used for accident and medical air ambulance missions, and search and rescue. As of 2009, the service operates a MBB/Kawasaki BK 117 B-2 helicopter, with two other BK 117s as backup to the primary rescue helicopter. It is run by a charitable trust formed in 1998, with major sponsor the Otago Regional Council. Based at Taieri Aerodrome near Mosgiel, it covers 25 percent of the country's land area. Retrieval missions typically transport patients to Dunedin Hospital, and the service works in cooperation with New Zealand's main ambulance provider, St John New Zealand. Around 400 missions and 600 flying hours are undertaken each year.

== History ==
The organisation was set up in August 1997 and formed into a trust in the following years. Co-founders were Michael Coburn and Ross Black, with Black being the chairman of the trust until his retirement in March 2019.

== Equipment ==
From 2001 to the present, the service operates a single Eurocopter EC 145 (ZK-IWD), an Airbus MBB-BK117 D2 ZK-IDH which is brand new as of jan 2019 (AIR 6) and five twin-engine BK 117 B-2 helicopter, registrations ZK-IWG (Air 1), ZK-HUP (Air 2), ZK-IME (Air 3), ZK-HJK (Air 4), ZK-IWL (Air 5) The helicopter can carry two stretcher patients, cruises at 125 knots (232 km/h), and has a range of 457 km (284 mi) or 909 km (565 mi) with optional fuel tanks. Some of the BK117 aircraft are fitted with a 76 m (249 ft) winch (HUP, sometimes IWG), a 30 million candlepower searchlight, and a neonatal intensive-care incubator. On board the crew has night vision goggles, dual GPS, satellite phone and a range of communications equipment. ZK-IWG, HUP and IWD are all capable of IFR flight.

== Notable missions ==
- 11 May 2003 – The boat Time Out capsizes and sinks 14 km (8.7 mi) off the coast near Oamaru, putting five men into the approximately 11 °C (52 °F) water. The boat owner activated an EPIRB beacon, allowing the helicopter to fly directly to the site using direction-finding equipment. It recovered two survivors suffering hypothermia, and the body of a third man. One of the helicopter crew then radioed a mayday call to shipping for the two other men, who were later presumed drowned.
- 25 January 2009 – The Otago Regional Rescue Helicopter together with a Southern Lakes helicopter achieve one of New Zealand's longest-range helicopter rescues, retrieving an injured crewman from the passenger liner MS Bremen about 815 km (506 mi) south of Invercargill. The Otago Daily Times reported the helicopter having a range of about 1,000 km (620 mi), dependent on conditions.

== Funding ==
The Otago Rescue Helicopter Trust was founded in 1998 to meet the cost of running the service, and funded the construction of the helipad on the roof of Dunedin Public Hospital. Operational funding is on a per call basis depending on the nature of the mission – the Accident Compensation Corporation for accidents, hospitals for inter-hospital transfers and the New Zealand Police for search and rescue. The service needs an additional NZ$400,000 – 500,000 annually, since 2008 the Otago Regional Council provides $250,000 per year. From 2002 until April 2008, the Lion Foundation sponsored the service.

== See also ==
- Emergency medical services in New Zealand
- Westpac Rescue Helicopter (New Zealand)
