= Wellington Free Ambulance =

Charitable organisation in New Zealand

- kia ora te tangata (Māori)
- Formation: 9 November 1927
- Type: Charitable organisation Ambulance service
- Headquarters: 19 Davis Street, Thorndon, Wellington
- Location: New Zealand
- Chief Executive Officer: David Robinson
- Expenses: $67,585,580 NZD
- Staff: Approximately 300 staff and 80 volunteers
- Website: www.wfa.org.nz

Wellington Free Ambulance (WFA) (Māori: kia ora te tangata), (Note: The Māori name translates to "Keeping people alive".) also known simply as Wellington Free, is a charitable organisation providing free-to-the-patient ambulance services in the Greater Wellington Region of New Zealand.

== History ==
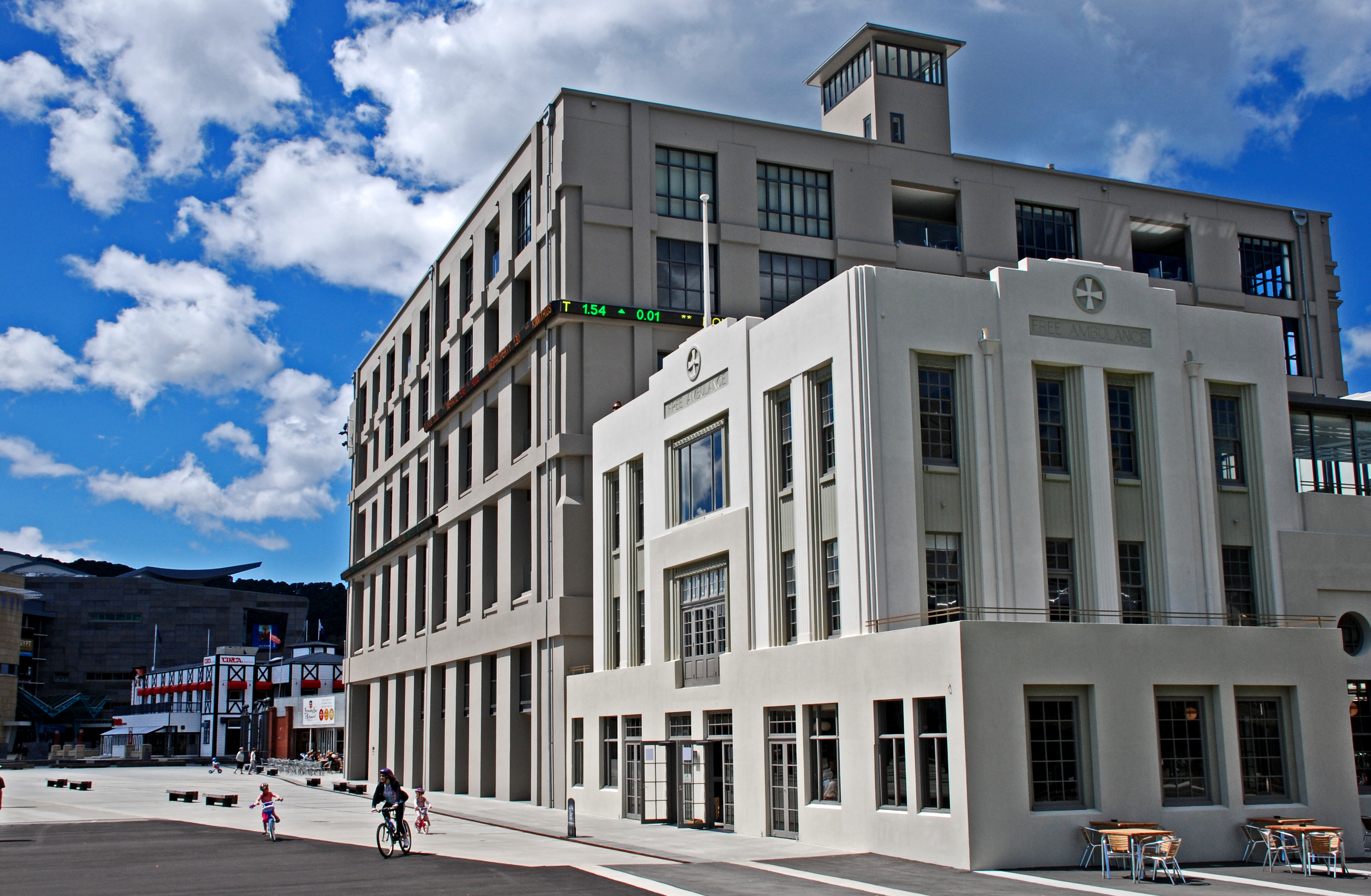
Former base in Cable Street

The Wellington Free Ambulance service was inaugurated on 9 November 1927 by the mayor of Wellington, Sir Charles Norwood. The catalyst for establishing a free ambulance service for the Wellington community came from the frustration of seeing an injured man lying on the road, and no hospital ambulance being available.

The service began operating from the Old Navals boatshed, which later became the Wellington Rowing Club clubhouse. The original station building soon proved to be less than desirable and in 1932, Lord Bledisloe laid the foundation stone on a purpose-built station in Cable Street.

Wellington Free expanded, and in 1956 the first station to be built out of Wellington City was established in Lower Hutt, followed by stations in Upper Hutt (1961), and Porirua (1963). The Kapiti Coast got its ambulance station in 1977, the same year a station was established in Newtown.

By the early 1990s, Wellington Free had outgrown its Cable St building. After a major fundraising effort, in 1994 then-Prince Charles opened a replacement station in Davis Street, Thorndon, which still operates as the service's headquarters today.

Bases were established in Waikanae and Wainuiomata in 1999, a replacement Porirua Station building opened in October 2000, followed by the Linkspan Response Post on the Wellington Waterfront in November 2008, and the Johnsonville Station in May 2010.

In March 2011, after a concerted fundraising and significant contribution by the Wellington Free Ambulance Trust, the Newtown Regional Ambulance Station was opened in the new Wellington Hospital grounds. In March 2012, after winning a Government tender to outsource the last DHB run ambulance service in the Wairarapa, Wellington Free Ambulance became the ambulance service in for the region.

== Operations ==
The service annually responds to 54,000 emergencies, answers over 178,000 emergency calls and provides 43,000 patient transfers across the Greater Wellington Region. The headquarters includes vehicle maintenance facilities, and a communications centre - one of three in the national network.

== Fleet ==
As of May 2024 Wellington Free Ambulance operates a fleet of around 95 vehicles. The current iteration of Emergency Ambulances are van body Mercedes Sprinters slowly replacing older custom box body ambulances. Wellington Free Ambulance also deploys a variety of other vehicles, such as Mitsubishi Outlanders for Extended Care, Patient Transfer Service (PTS) and community outreach. For Event Medical Services Wellington Free Ambulance uses Ambulances, 4wd vehicles and even Golf Carts and buggies. Wellington Free Ambulance also operates a purpose-built Major Incident Support Team (MIST) truck.

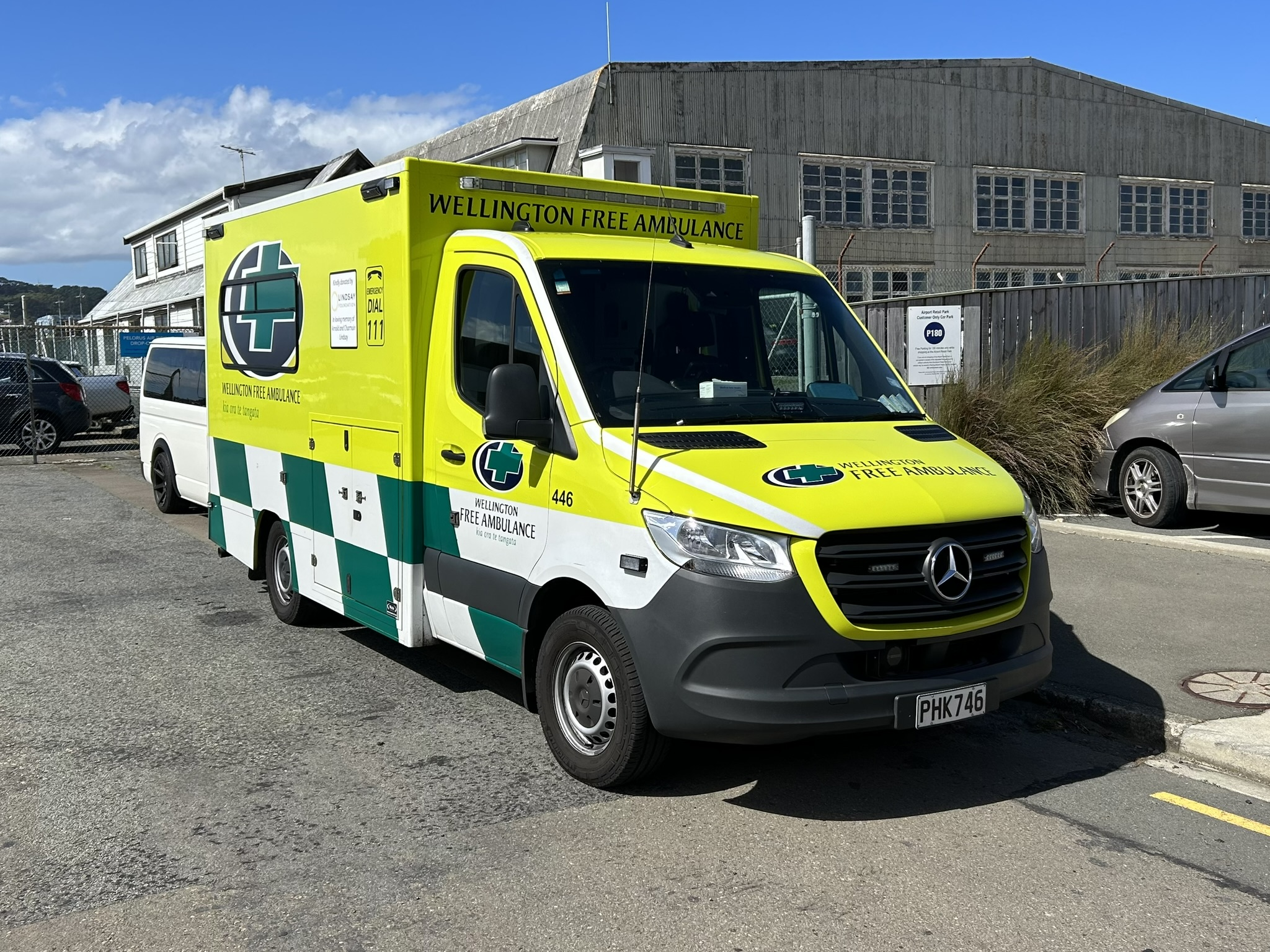
Mercedes Sprinter (Box Body) - Emergency Ambulance Service

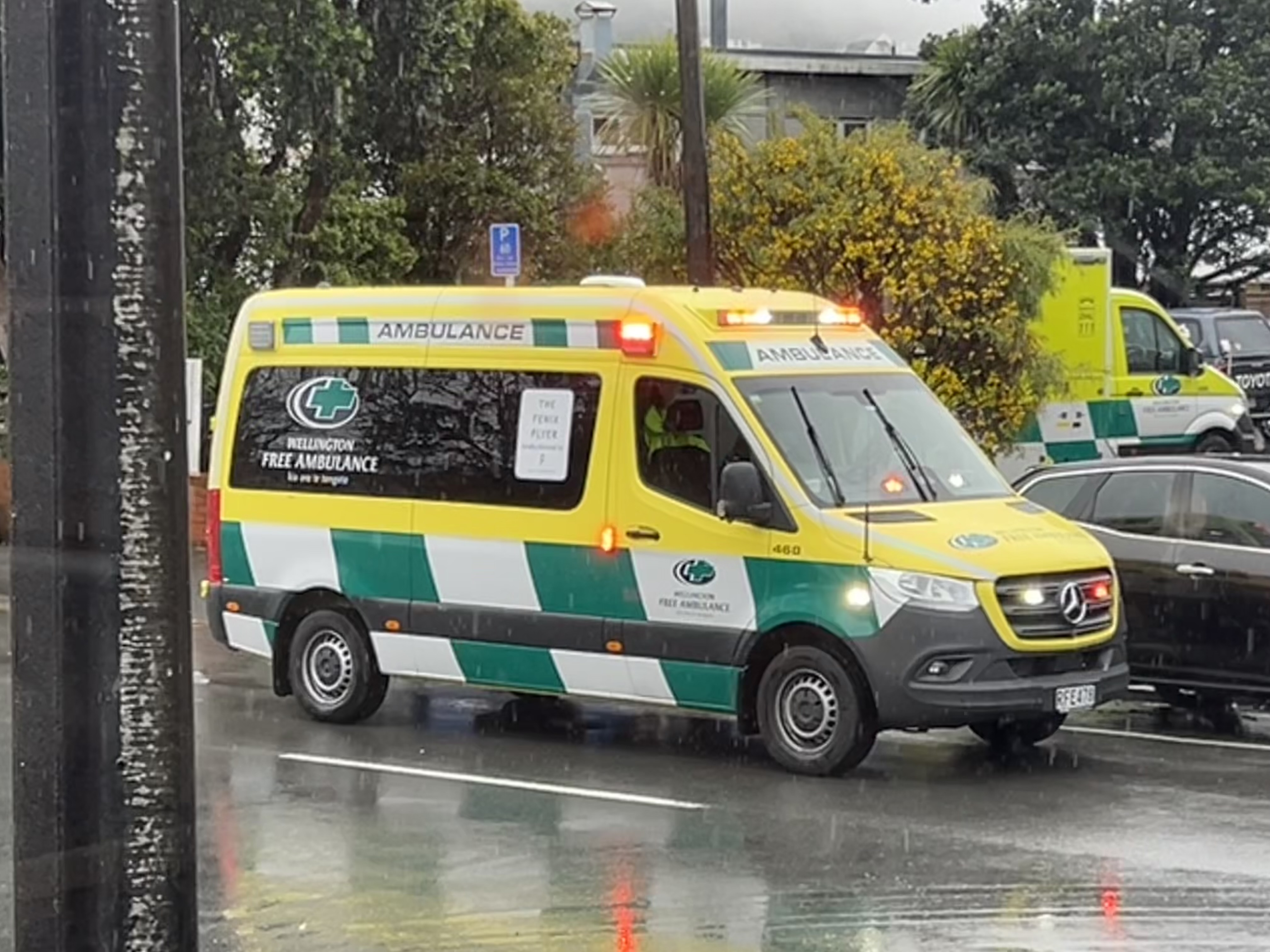
Mercedes Sprinter (Van Body) - Emergency Ambulance Service

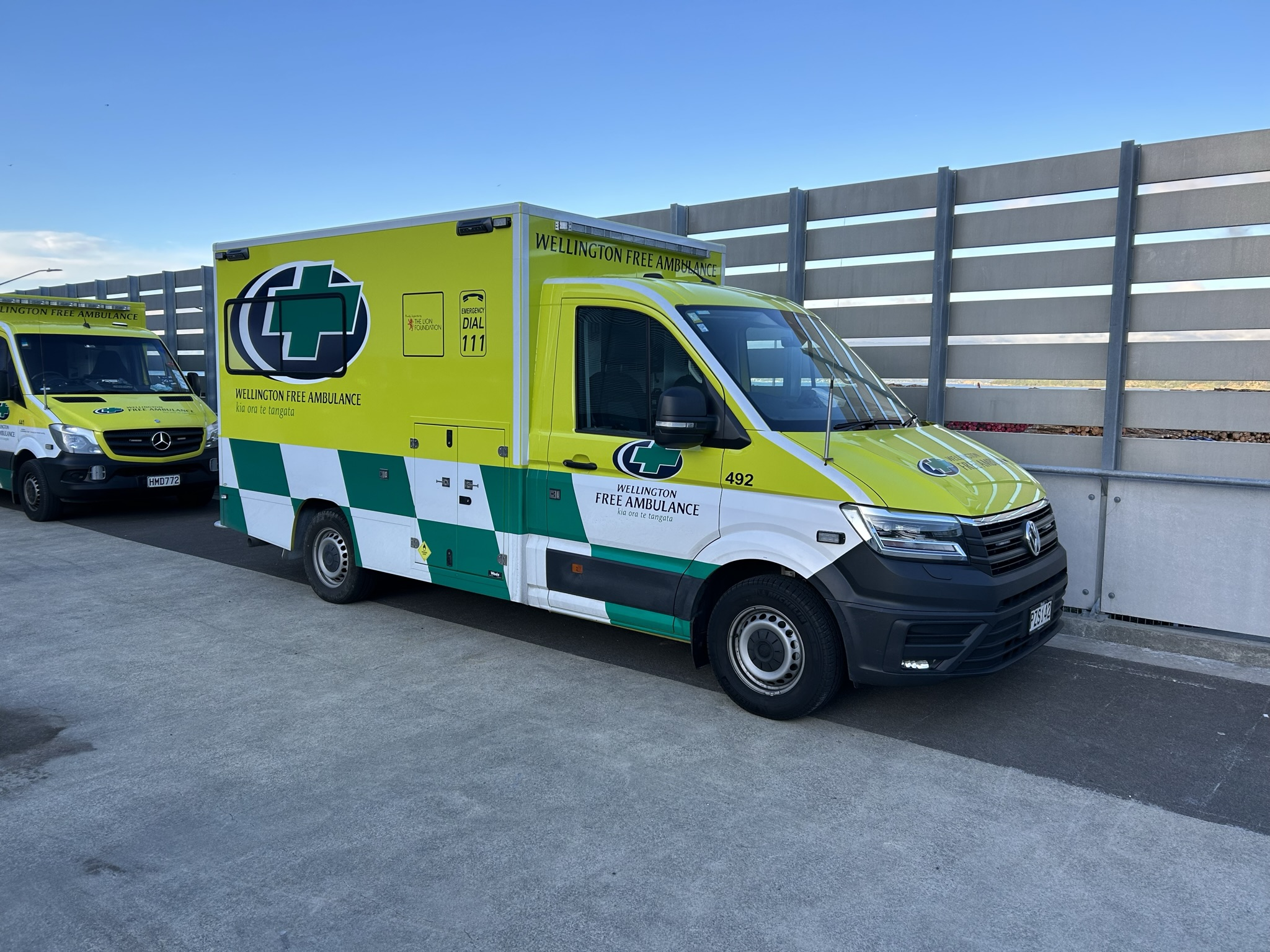
Volkswagen Crafter - Emergency Ambulance Service

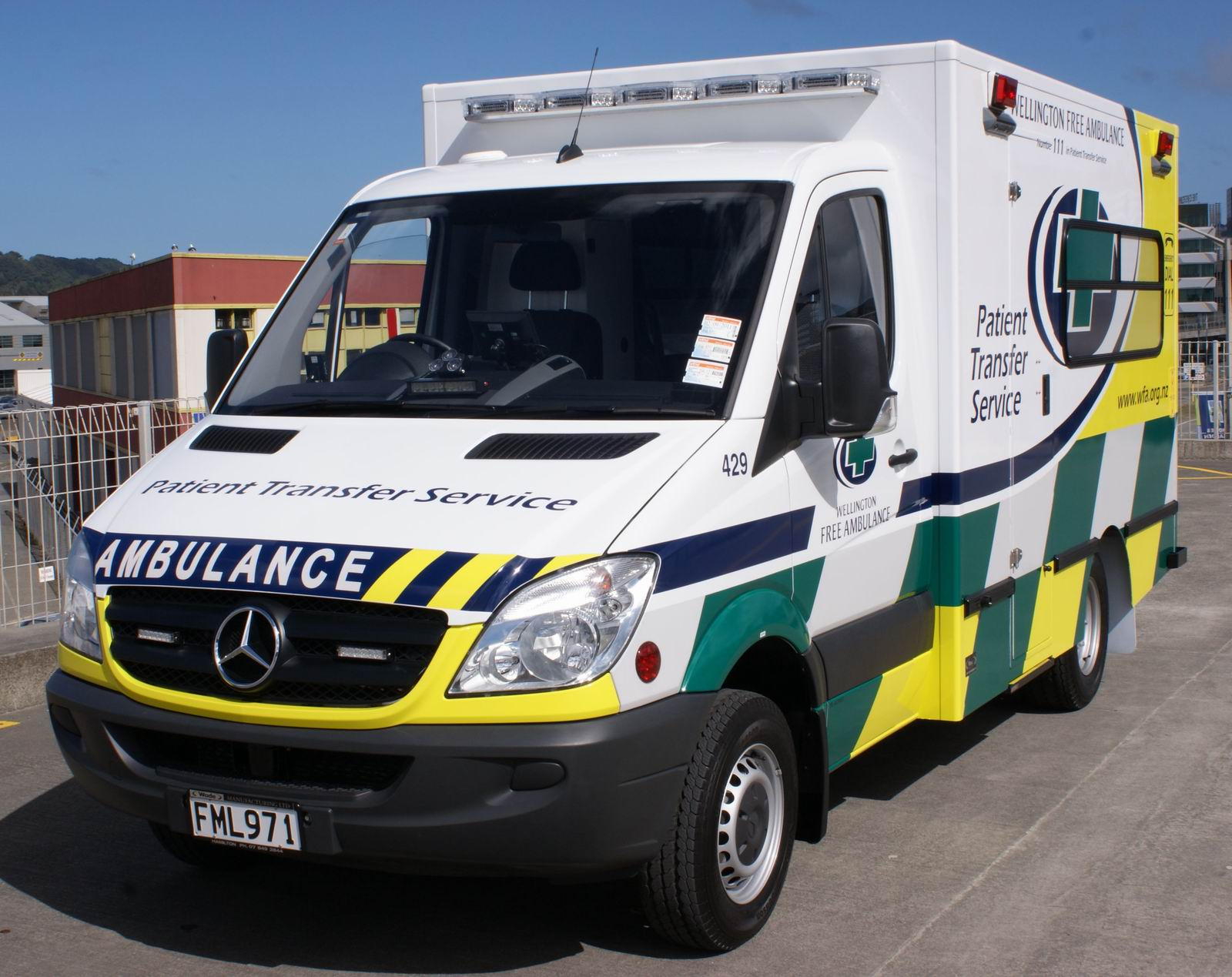
Mercedes Sprinter - Patient Transfer Service

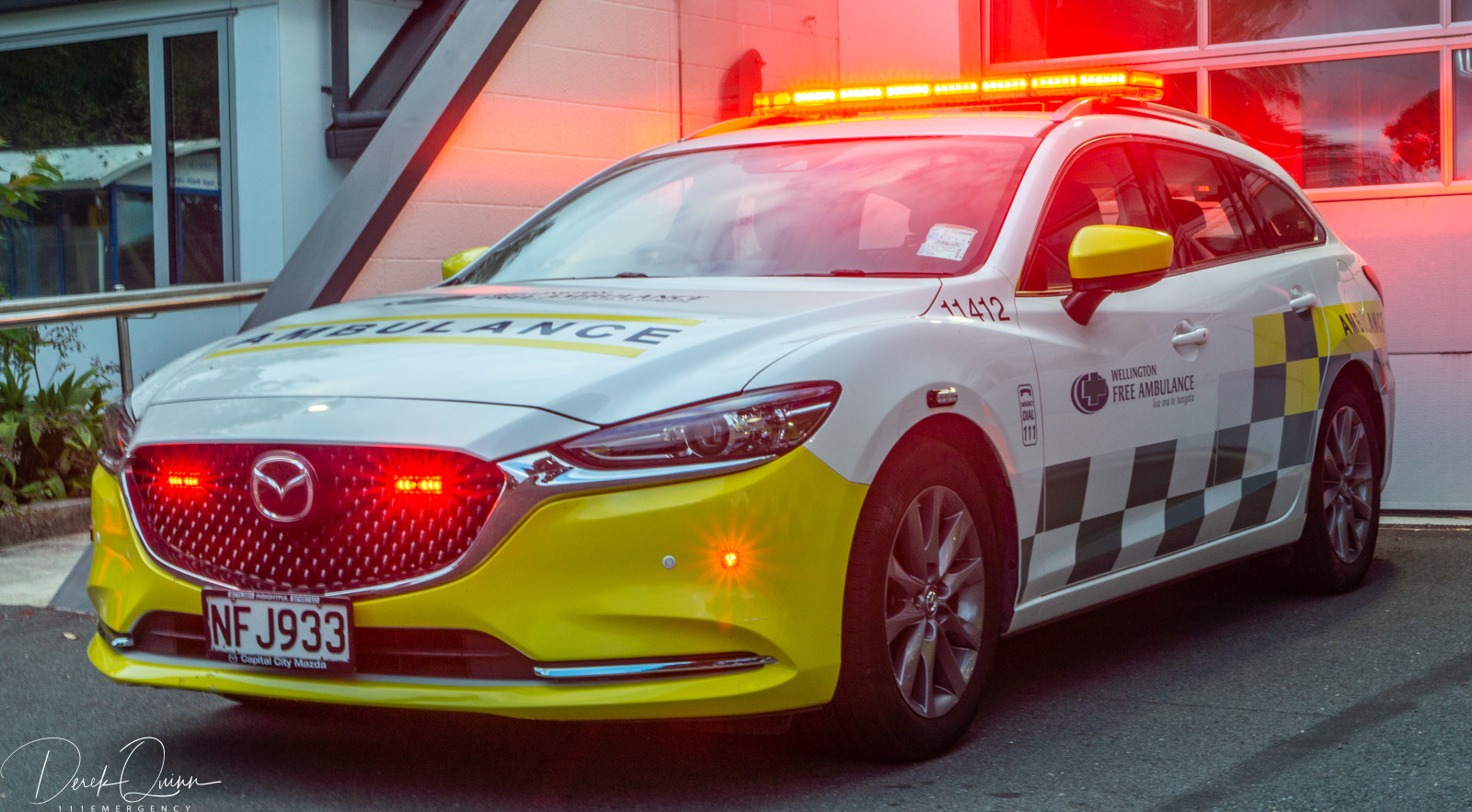
Mazda 6 - Critical Care Paramedic

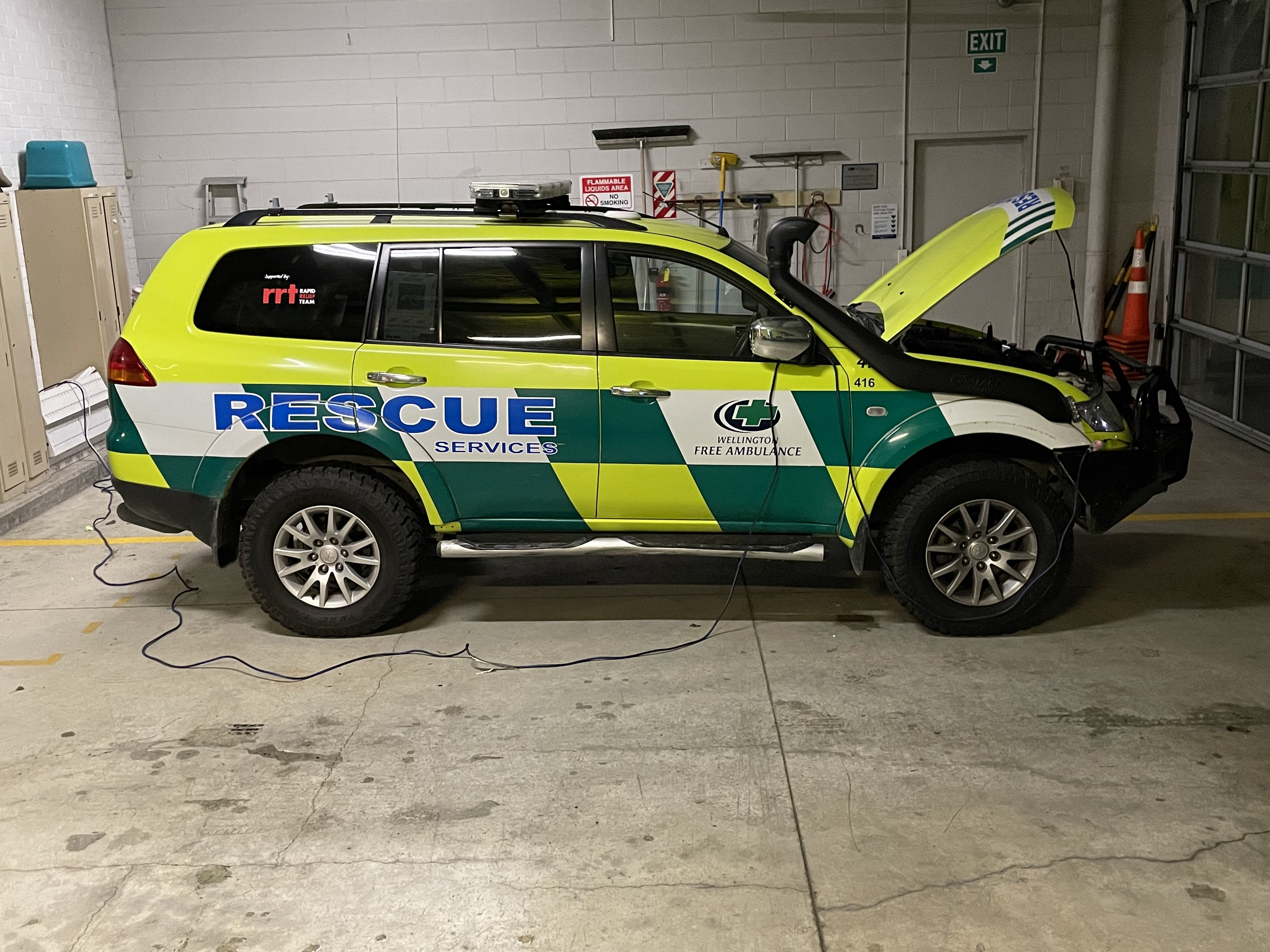
Mitsubishi Challenger - Rescue 1

== Funding ==
The operational cost of running the service in 2024 was $67,585,580 NZD. 80% of this cost is met by Health New Zealand and the Accident Compensation Corporation. The remainder comes from donations and bequests from the public, proceeds from first aid training and supplies, and medical alarms.

== See also ==
- Hato Hone St John
