= Hato Hone St John =

Ambulance service in New Zealand

- Formation: April 30, 1885 (141 years ago)
- Type: Charitable organisation
- Purpose: First aid and pre-hospital care
- Headquarters: 2 Harrison Road, Ellerslie, Auckland
- Location: New Zealand
- Chief Executive: Peter Bradley
- Staff: 12,444
- Website: stjohn.org.nz

Hato Hone St John, also often referred to as St John Ambulance New Zealand, is a charitable organisation providing healthcare services to the New Zealand public. The organisation provides pre-hospital ambulance care throughout New Zealand apart from the Greater Wellington Region and Wairarapa, as well as certain other health services. In September 2022, the charity changed its name from St John to the bilingual te reo-English Hato Hone St John to reflect the dual Māori-Pākehā identity of New Zealand.

== History ==
A branch of the St John Ambulance was first founded in Christchurch, New Zealand, on 30 April 1885. It was decided to appoint the Governor (William Jervois) as president, and the mayors of Christchurch (Charles Hulbert), Sydenham (William White), and St Albans (Benjamin Bull) as vice-presidents. Further branches quickly spread across the country providing first aid and patient transport and in 1946, due to the efforts of St John in New Zealand during the Second World War, the organisation was elevated to a full Priory, with the Governor-General of New Zealand as the Prior.

During the 1970s and 1980s much restructuring took place in response to changing social and economic conditions, moving away from the traditional militaristic structure and resulting in the current modern organisation.

Today, Hato Hone St John is a major health service provider in New Zealand. It provides 90% of the emergency and non-emergency ambulance coverage for the New Zealand population, emergency care and first aid at public events, support phone lines for the elderly and house-bound, hospital patient transport, public first aid training, health products and youth programmes.

In June 2020, Hato Hone St John announced that it would be laying off staff due to a NZ$30 million deficit caused by the economic effects of the COVID-19 pandemic. The organisation had failed to secure a wage subsidy from the Government despite a 40% drop in income.

In August 2024, Hato Hone St John ambulance workers and call centre staff affiliated with the New Zealand Ambulance Association and First Union New Zealand staged strikes on 20 and 24 August in response to a breakdown in pay negotiations with the ambulance service. In mid-October 2024, Associate Health Minister Casey Costello announced that St John would receive an additional NZ$21 million in government funding.

== Services ==
=== Ambulance services ===
Hato Hone St John provides ambulance services for approximately 90% of New Zealand's population. The only area where the organisation does not provide emergency ambulance services is the Greater Wellington region, where Wellington Free Ambulance is the provider. Hato Hone St John treated or transported 549,150 patients in 2025, answering more than 688,378 emergency calls.

=== Waka Ora Health Shuttle ===
In addition to the traditional emergency ambulance response, Hato Hone St John operate over 60 community-based patient-transfer shuttle services. Using both multi-seat vans (equipped with wheelchair hoists) or small SUV's, this enables over 10,000 people annually who are unable to utilise either public or private transport to attend their scheduled medical appointments at major hospitals. Run by volunteer drivers and assistants the service relies on the goodwill and donations of the local community for its operation.

== Volunteers ==
Hato Hone St John is a charitable organisation which relies on its volunteer workforce to deliver health services to the New Zealand population. Volunteers outnumber paid employees by around three to one. In 2025, 8,057 people volunteered for Hato Hone St John and the organisation had 3,353 paid staff. St John volunteers receive specialised training and clinical education.

In early August 2025, Hato Hone St John proposed scrapping various community voluntary programmes including hospital volunteers, community carers and pet therapy services as part of a review of its services. St John has said that it was exploring whether other community organisations could provide these services. If the cutbacks go ahead, this would affect about 1,100 people.

== Fleet ==
Hato Hone St John operates a fleet of around 1400 vehicles. The fleet is made up a variety of vehicles with the average Emergency Ambulance costing around NZ$317,000. In April 2024 Hato Hone St John trialled a Ford E-Transit which was the first Electric Emergency Ambulance in Australasia. The Hato Hone St John fleet also includes vehicles from other specialist services such as the Patient Transfer Service (PTS), the Major Incident Support Team (MIST), Critical Care Paramedics, Extended Care Paramedics, First Response Units and the Waka Ora Health Shuttle. Currently Hato Hone St John uses a livery which incorporates highly visible, reflective green-and-yellow Battenburg markings with chevrons and Māori cultural designs integrated. Hato Hone St Johns believes it is the first ambulance livery in the world to incorporate cultural designs with emergency vehicle safety standards.

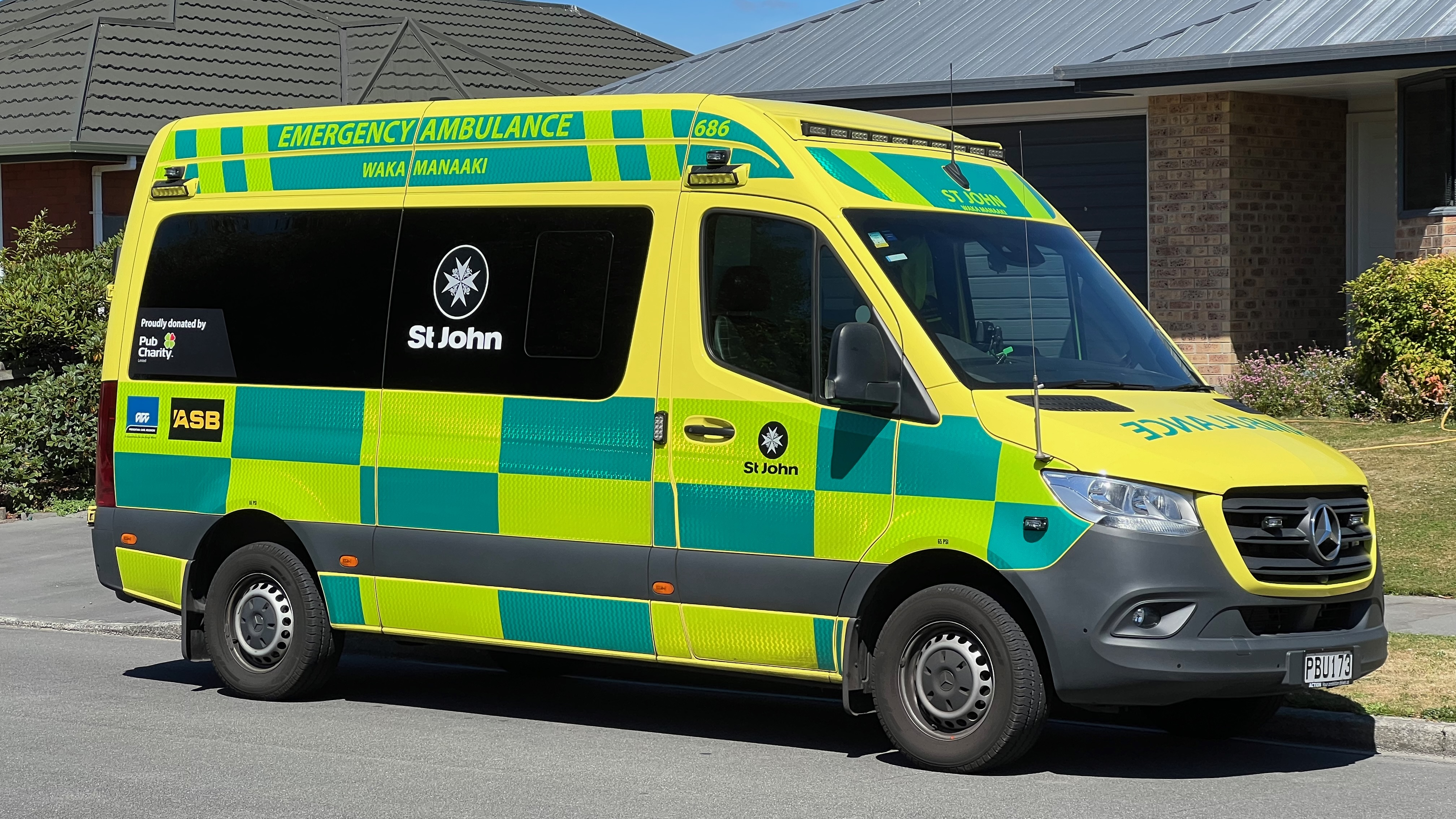
Mercedes Sprinter Emergency Ambulance

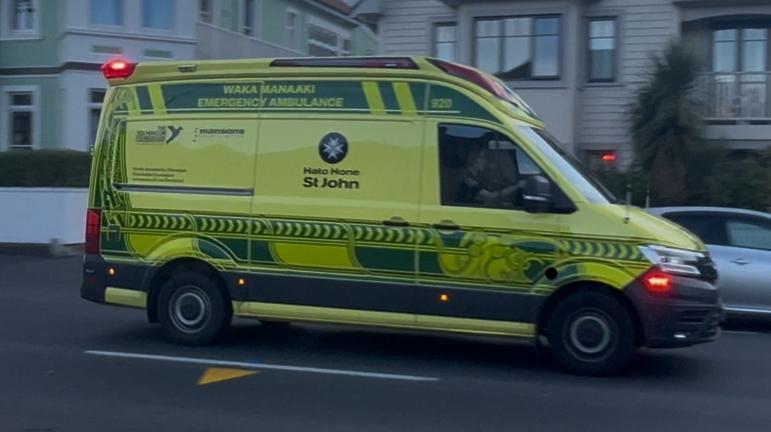
Volkswagen Crafter Emergency Ambulance

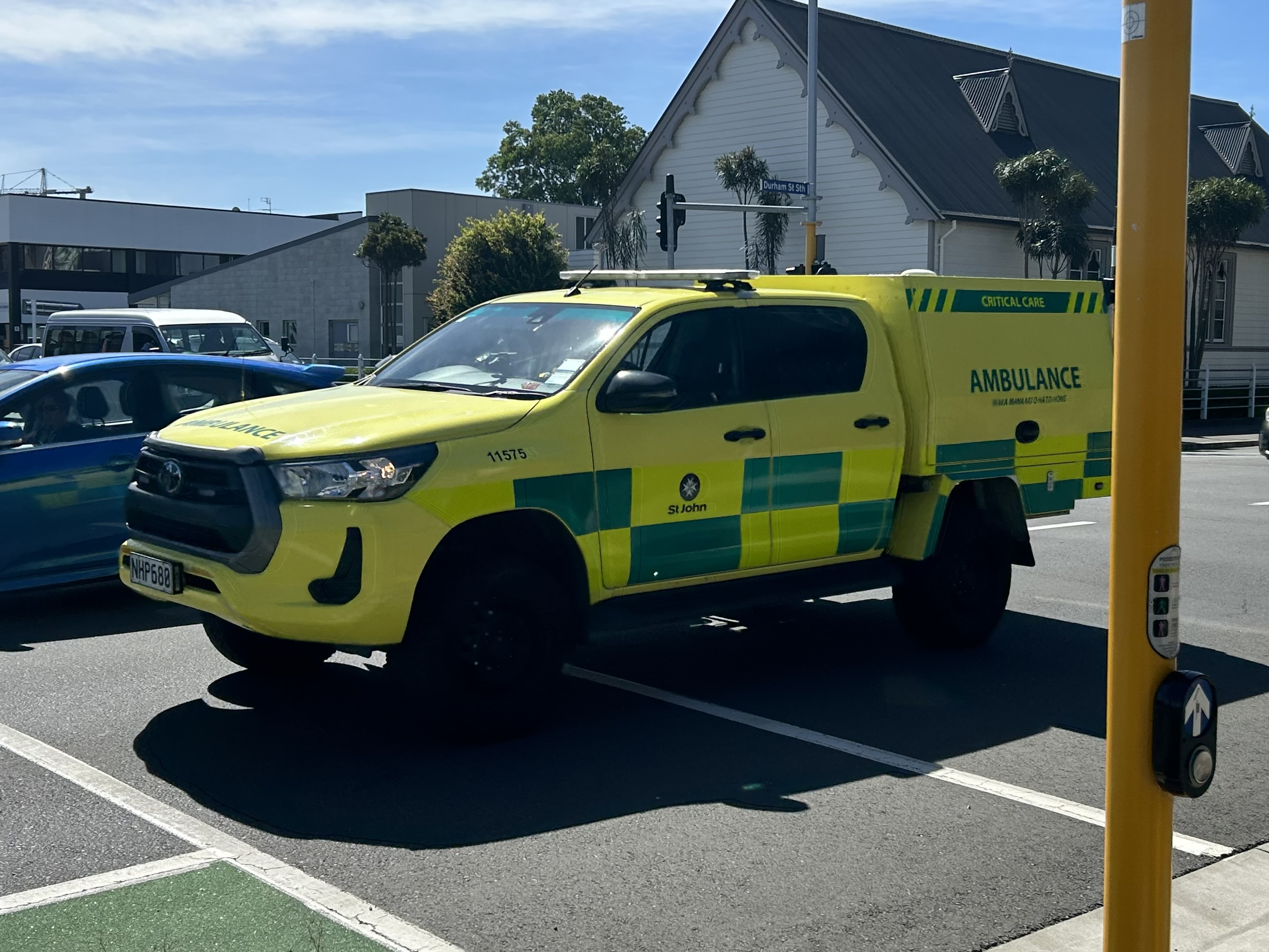
Toyota Hilux Critical Care Ambulance

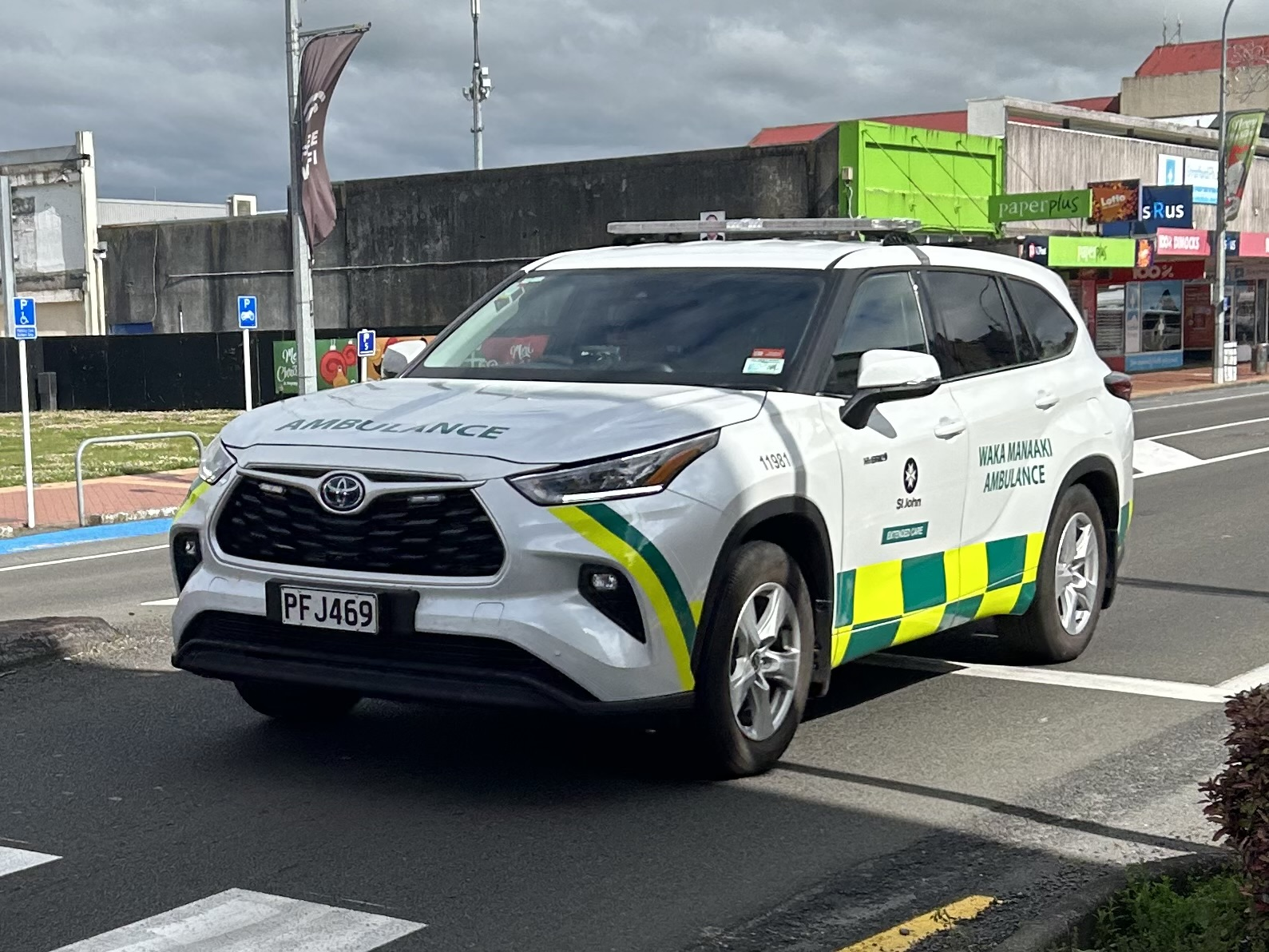
Toyota Highlander Extended Care Ambulance

== Funding ==
Contracts with the Ministry of Health, ACC and district health boards fund just under 90% of the direct operating costs of the Hato Hone St John ambulance service as of 2022.

The difference is made up from community and corporate donations, fundraising, revenue from commercial activities (first aid kits, first aid training, medical alarms and defibrillators), as well as income from emergency ambulance part charges.

These activities also fund the delivery of non-ambulance services such as the Hato Hone St John Youth programmes, Friends of the Emergency Department, Hospital Friends, Caring Caller, Hato Hone St John Safe Kids and Outreach Therapy Pets.

=== ASB partnership ===
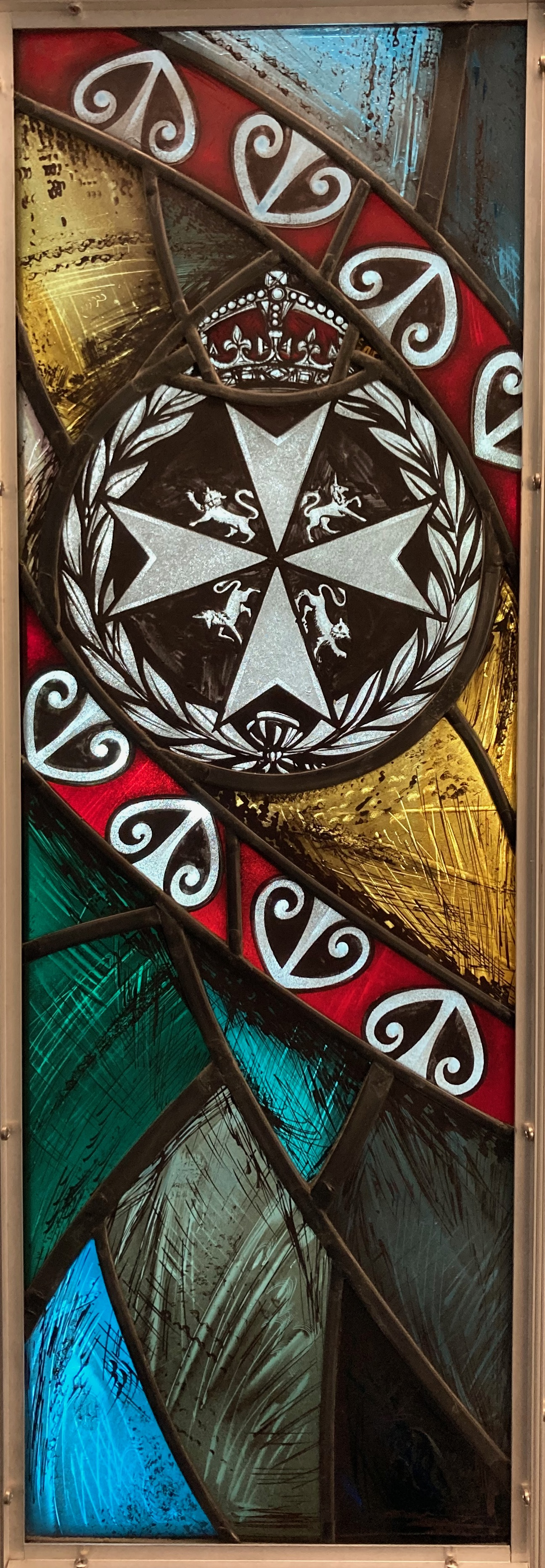
St John stained-glass window in the Wellington Hospital chapel

In 2008, St John and ASB Bank initiated a partnership. The partnership helps to expand support for St John services and deliver programmes like CPR training on a wide scale. At the same time, the partnership gives ASB the opportunity to strengthen connections with local communities and give their employees the opportunity to get involved with community services by volunteering for St John.

The partnership was launched with ASB providing the opportunity for 1,000 school children at 10 schools to learn the lifesaving resuscitation skill CPR for free.

== The Order of St John ==
Hato Hone St John in New Zealand has global links to the international Order of St John. His Majesty the King is Sovereign Head of the Order and the Governor-General of New Zealand is the head or Prior of St John in New Zealand.

In 1888, in recognition of its work, Queen Victoria made the Order of St John a Royal Order of Chivalry. In New Zealand, Royal Honours continue to be awarded to members for outstanding contributions and commitment to care for their communities. These Royal Honours are an independent part of the New Zealand Honours System. Honours are conferred annually at St John Investiture services.

== See also ==
- Service Medal of the Order of St John
- St John Youth New Zealand
