= Northland Emergency Services Trust =

Rescue helicopter service in New Zealand

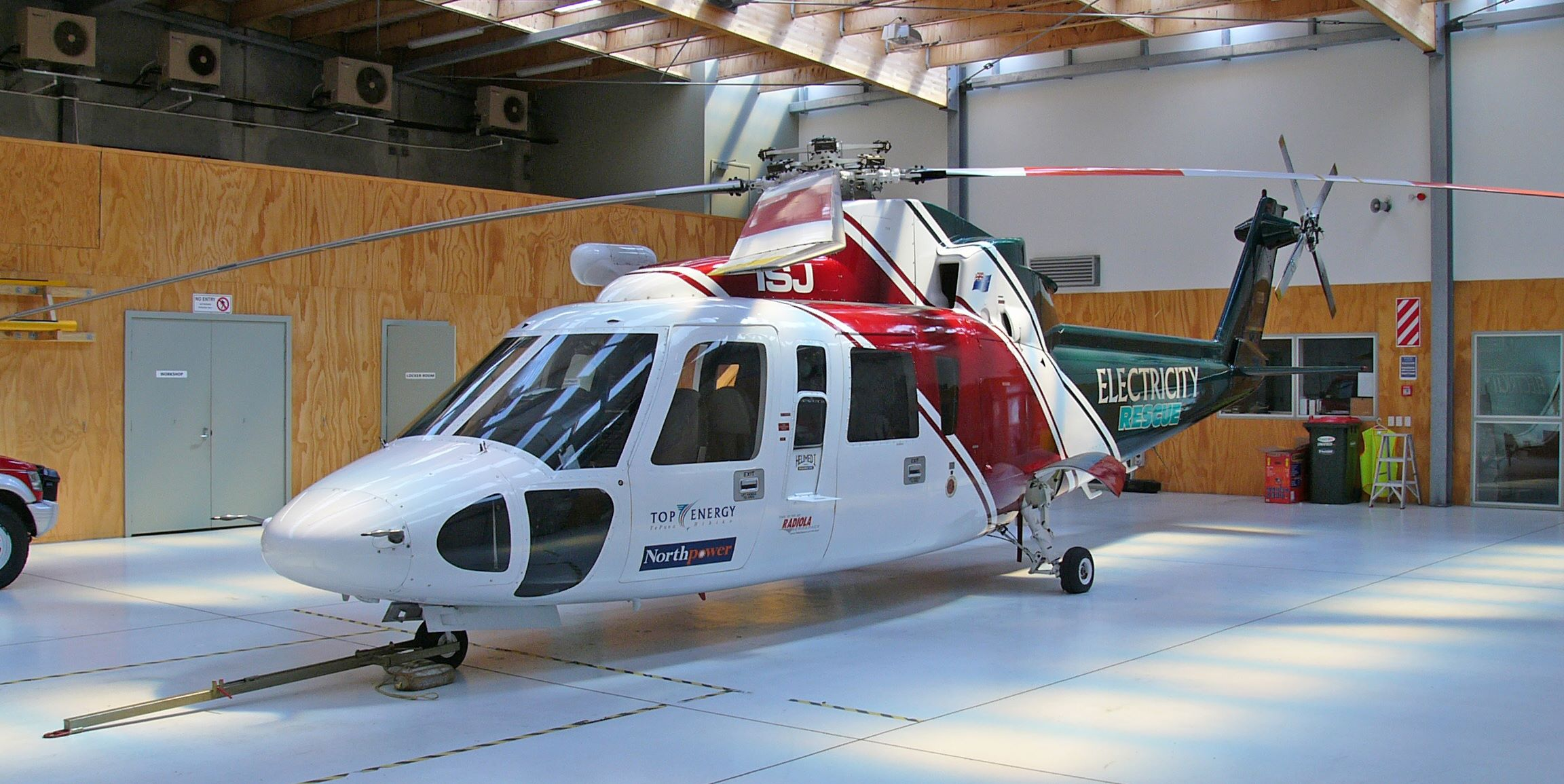
The helicopter of the trust in hangar in 2005.

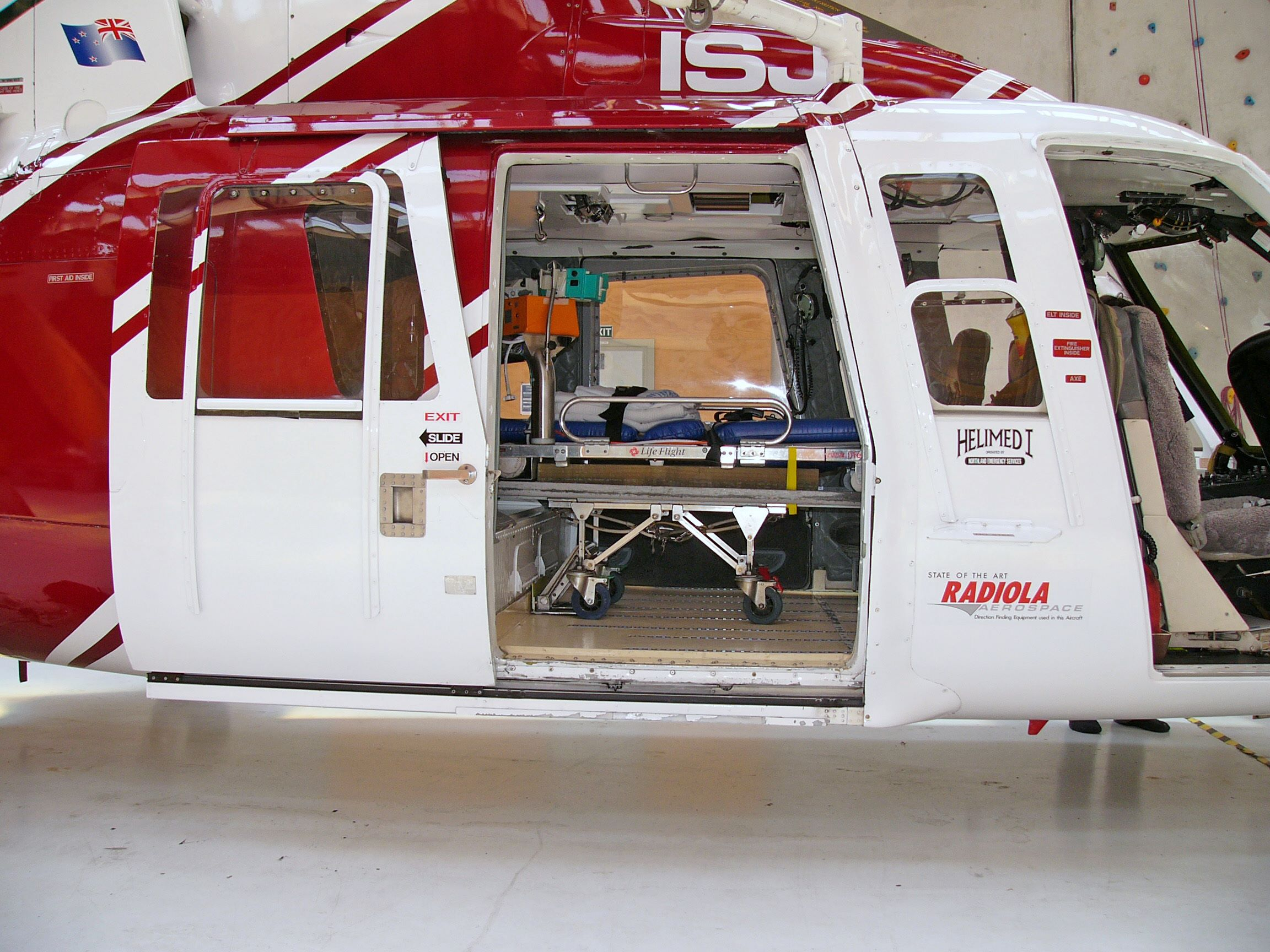
A side view of Helimed 1

The Northland Emergency Services Trust (NEST) is an emergency air rescue service in Whangārei, New Zealand. The Trust is supported by contributions from local sponsors, individuals, families, businesses and organisations. The operator, Northern Rescue Helicopter Ltd. (NRHL), is a joint venture between Northland Emergency Services Trust and Auckland Rescue Helicopter Trust.

== History ==
The concept for the Northland Emergency Services Trust was conceived at a public meeting called at the request of the Auckland Surf Club in 1988. The meeting discussed the idea of having a rescue helicopter in Northland for three months over the summer period.

Joyce Ryan, who was the Mayor of Whangārei at the time, asked those present if they thought the money that was being asked for, to run the service for three months, seemed fair. After discussion, the St John contingent said: “We can do the same job for the same money, but for the whole year.”

Since then, NEST transported the first patient on 15 November 1988 and has since carried more than 20,000 passengers.

In 1988, when NEST began, its first emergency helicopter was a Bell 206 – which is a basic single pilot, one engine and one patient rescue helicopter.

In 1991, the Bell Jet Ranger was replaced with a more powerful Eurocopter Squirrel emergency helicopter and in 1994 the Squirrel was replaced with a twin-engine MBB/Kawasaki BK 117.

In 1997, the first Sikorsky S-76 emergency helicopter was acquired, the fleet has expanded to include a total of 3 rescue helicopters, with two of the S76 A's retired after the introduction of two C++ models.

== Helicopters ==
NEST currently operate two Sikorsky S-76 helicopters in Search and Rescue, Medevac, and Hospital transfer roles from its base at Whangarei Airport, Onerahi. NEST's current fleet includes two S76 C++ models, (ZK-HQO and ZK-HQC), which were acquired in 2018. There have been several helicopter upgrades since the formation of NEST in 1988, including a Bell 206B Jetranger, a Eurocopter Squirrel, and a MBB/Kawasaki BK 117.

The Northland Rescue Helicopter fleet has a longer range (3hrs 10mins standard or 5hrs 30mins with a spare tank fitted), is faster (155 knots) and has more room inside than any other rescue helicopter in New Zealand. Its operational range covers a radius of 270 km (170 mi) from its base, making it suitable for all of Northland, extending south beyond Auckland, and offshore work. The helicopters are set up to allow two pilots, two patients on horizontal stretchers and four medical support staff to occupy the cabin.

== Fundraising ==
Funds for NEST are collected through annual appeals, sponsored by Northpower and Top Energy.
