= Auckland Rescue Helicopter Trust =

Helicopter Ambulance Service

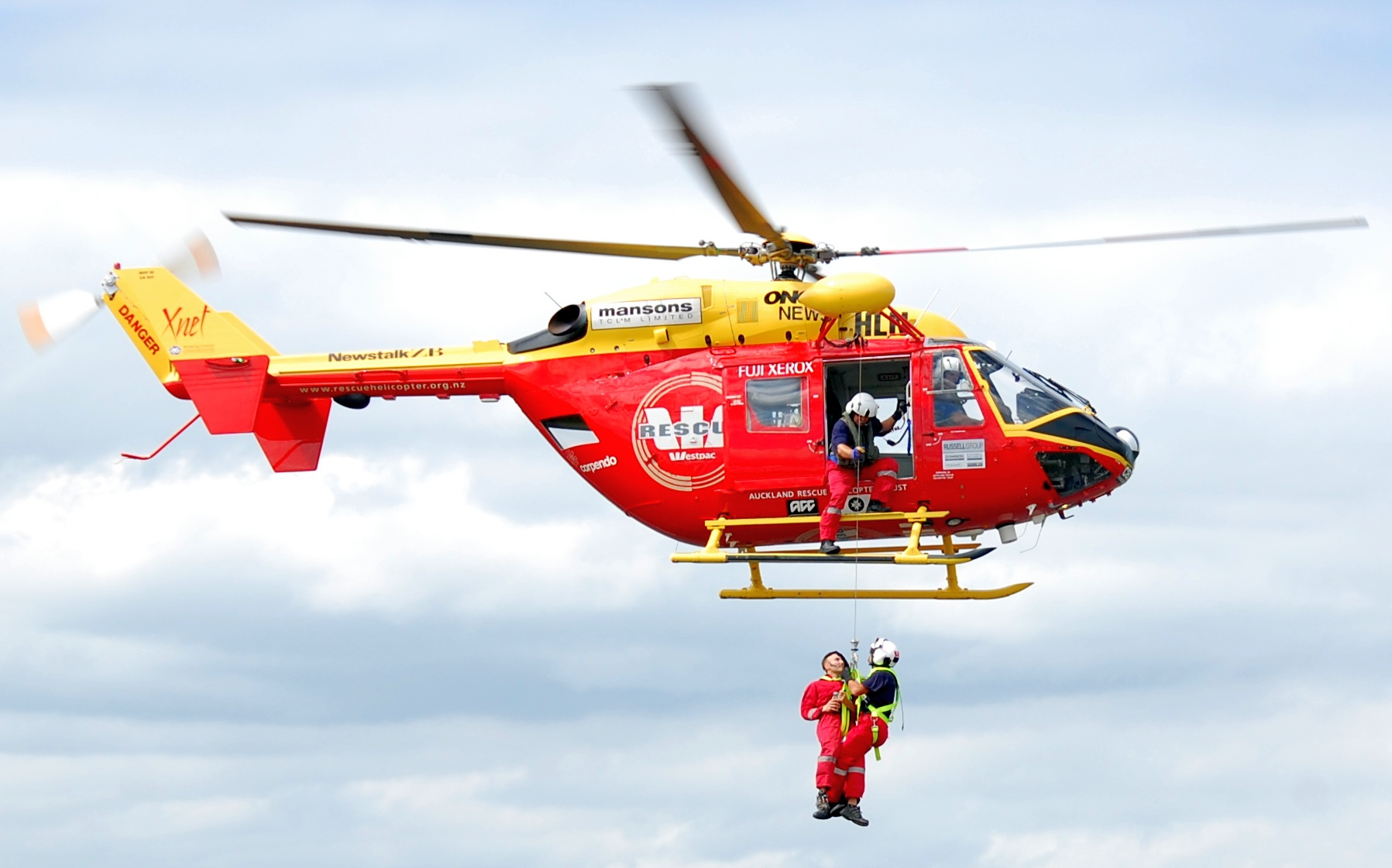
- Westpac Rescue Helicopter
- Formation: 1970
- Type: Nonprofit
- Purpose: Resue helicopter service
- Headquarters: 50 Anzac Avenue, Auckland CBD, Auckland 1010
- Location: Auckland, New Zealand
- Coordinates: 36.8472015°S 174.7886493°E
- Official language: English
- Website: https://www.rescuehelicopter.org.nz/

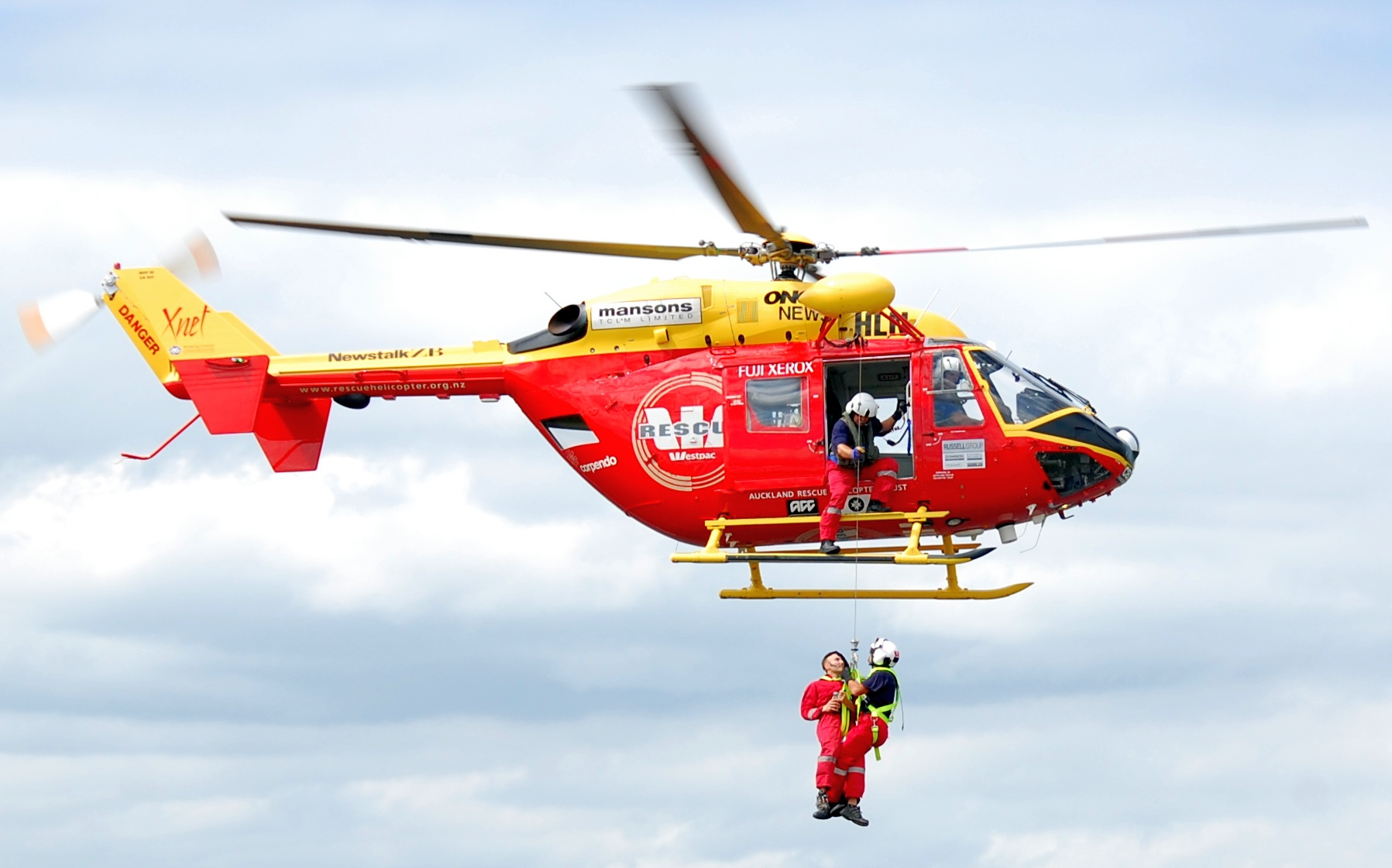
Westpac Rescue Helicopter during a demonstration in 2009 at the Whenuapai Air Show.

The Auckland Westpac Rescue Helicopter is a New Zealand accident and emergency rescue and transport service operated by Northern Rescue Helicopter Ltd (NRHL). The operator is a joint venture between Northland Emergency Services Trust and Auckland Rescue Helicopter Trust.

The trust operates two AW169 and one BK117 helicopters on behalf of the helicopter owners—the greater Auckland community. There are four "Westpac Rescue Helicopter" services in New Zealand, but they are all separate entities and only linked by the same major sponsor.

The aircraft and crew are trained and equipped to operate day and night, their missions range from emergency/accident casualty transport, to medical transfers (medevacs), rescue searches and airlifts. The service flew 1212 missions in 2021. The trust added specialist emergency medicine critical care doctors to the crew line-up in September 2011 when it commenced a two-year HEMS (Helicopter Emergency Medical Service) pilot study in partnership with Auckland District Health Board (ADHB). The project received additional funding to continue for a further three years in mid 2013.

== History ==
The Auckland Rescue Helicopter Service was started by the Auckland Surf Life Saving Association leasing a Hiller 12E helicopter from Alexander Helicopters Ltd for six summer weekends of 1970/1971, becoming what the trust claims was the world's first civilian rescue helicopter service. The helicopter flown by George Sobiecke was based on the hill behind the Piha Surf Life Saving Club. From 1971 on, the rescue helicopter service operated during the surf life saving club patrolling season from Labour Weekend to Easter. A Rescue Helicopter Squad of 32 specially trained lifeguards from the various clubs affiliated to the Auckland Surf Life Saving Association was formed. Pilot George Sobieke departed in 1972 to be replaced by Sam Anderson. Surf reports were radioed from the helicopter for live broadcast over Radio Hauraki.

In January 1973 the Hiller 12E was replaced by a jet engine powered Hiller FH1100. Apart from weekends this helicopter was also used during the summer school holidays and had one of the helicopter squad members working as a paid helicopter lifeguard for this period. Money raised from surf reports provided by the duty helicopter lifeguards was used to purchase and redecorate a bach opposite the toilet block on the middle beach at Piha. This became the summer base for the rescue helicopter crew with a landing pad to the north of the Piha Middle Beach toilet block.

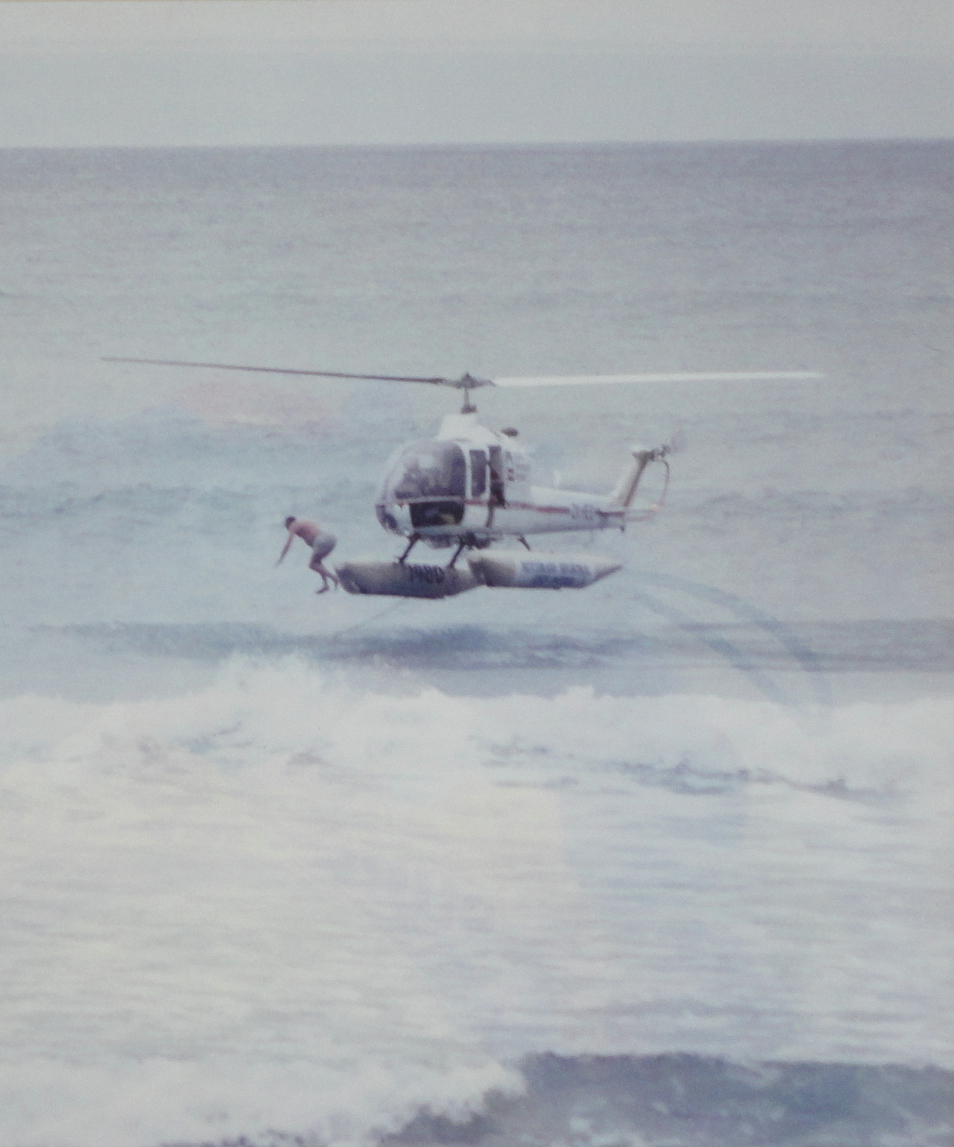
The Prime Minister doing a jump

In 1977 Keith McKenzie replaced Sam Anderson as the pilot. On 8 January 1977 the then Prime Minister Robert Muldoon, who was at Piha for the re-opening of the Piha Surf Life Saving club house after the Project 40 rebuild, joined the helicopter lifeguards to jump into the surf and be lifted out of the water and be transported back to the beach slung under the helicopter using the rescue strop connected into the cargo hook.

== Helicopters ==
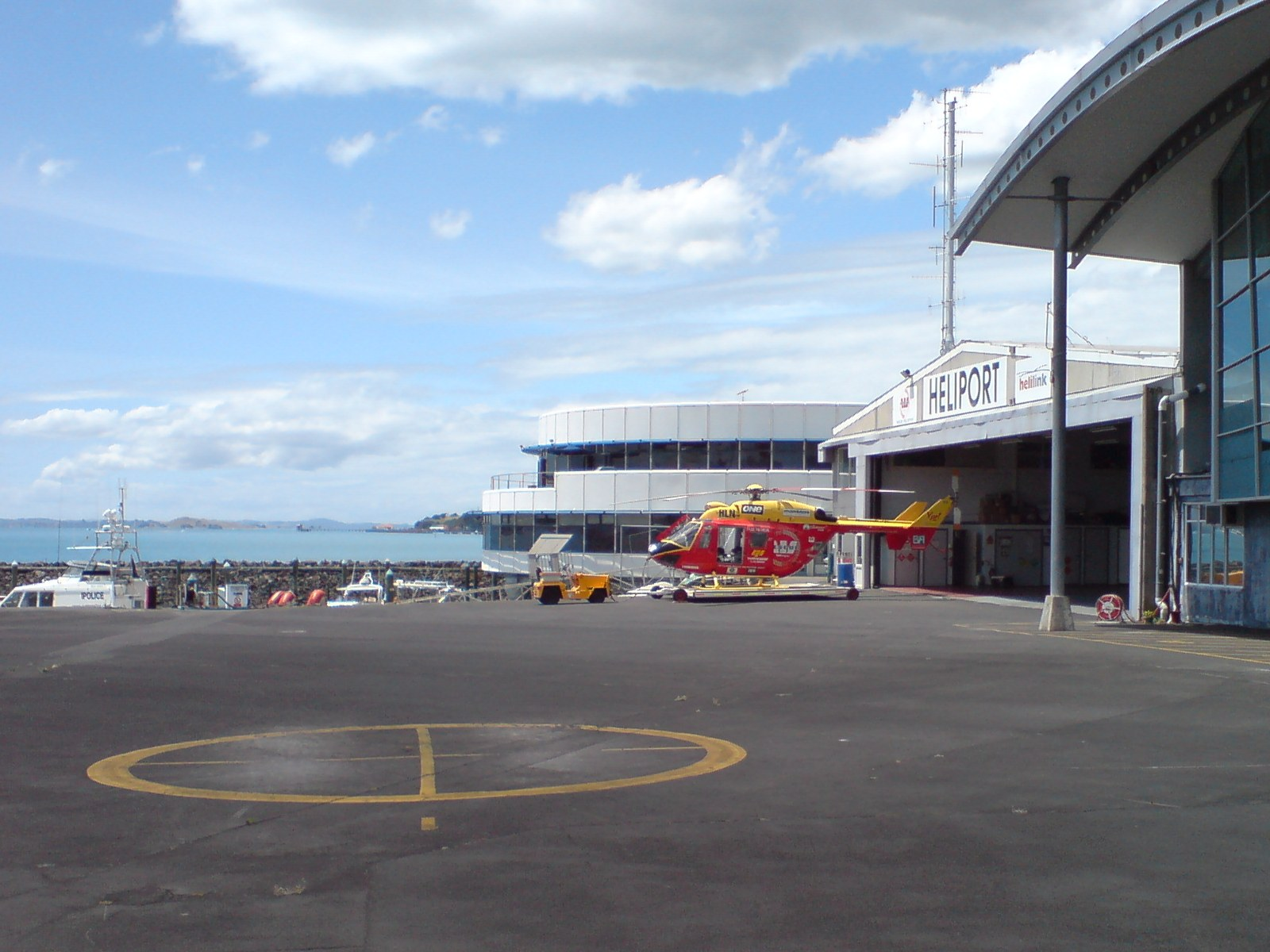
The Auckland helicopter at its base in Mechanics Bay.

The trust operates one BK117 (850D2 variant) helicopter. These can attain cruising (long-distance) speeds of around 200 km/h (120 mph), and have a range of about 500 km (300 nautical miles), carrying 605 litres internally and a further 300 litres with auxiliary fuel tanks. Its registration is ZK-HKZ, callsign Westpac Rescue 3.

A leased Auckland service model was replaced in 2007 by a second-hand model of the same make (with a low number of flight hours and was fully rebuilt from the ground up), and equipped with extended night-flying gear, weather radar and better internal configuration. The new helicopter cost $3.3 million NZD, compared with a yearly lease of NZ$1 million for the previous model. A second machine was purchased in 2010, providing better coverage to the more than 1.5 million population of the serviced region.

The trust replaced one of the BK117s with two AgustaWestland AW169s in 2018 following a public fundraising campaign. The first was delivered in late 2018 and the second a few months later becoming fully operational in July 2019. Their registrations and callsigns are ZK-HLH (Westpac Rescue One) and ZK-IZB (Westpac Rescue Two).

The AW169s are equipped with full 'glass' cockpits, Helicopter Terrain Awareness & Warning System (HTAWS), Traffic Collison Avoidance System (TCAS), Forward Looking Infra-Red (FLIR), and has a Synthetic Vision System (SVS).

== Funding ==
Auckland Rescue Helicopter Trust (ARHT) exists as the fundraising entity for the Auckland Rescue Helicopter. The helicopters also have numerous financial supporters in the community and corporate sectors as they are only partially Government funded. The main naming rights sponsor is the Australasian bank Westpac. The sponsorship began in 1981 when Westpac sponsored the Wellington helicopter service.

== See also ==
- Northland Emergency Services Trust
- Otago Rescue Helicopter Trust
- Piha Surf Life Saving Club
- Life Flight (New Zealand)
- Westpac Life Saver Rescue Helicopter Service
