= List of rotorcraft =

This is a list of rotorcraft, including helicopters, autogyros, rotor kites and convertiplanes.

== A ==
=== A-B Helicopters ===
- A-B Helicopters A/W 95

=== Adney ===
- Adney Helicopter

=== Aero ===
- Aero HC-2 Heli Baby

=== Aero-Astra ===
- Aero-Astra Okhotnik 1

=== Aero Eli Serviza ===
- Aero Eli Serviza Yo-Yo 222

=== Aerokopter ===
- Aerokopter AK1-3 Sanka

=== Aerospace General ===
- Aerospace General Mini-Copter

=== Aérospatiale ===
- Aérospatiale Alouette II
- Aérospatiale Alouette III
- Aérospatiale Cougar
- Aérospatiale Dauphin
- Aérospatiale Djinn
- Aérospatiale Ecureuil
- Aérospatiale Gazelle
- Aérospatiale Lama
- Aérospatiale Puma
- Aérospatiale Super Frelon
- Aérospatiale Super Puma

=== Aerotécnica ===
- Aerotécnica AC-11
- Aerotécnica AC-12
- Aerotécnica AC-14

=== Agusta ===
- Agusta A103
- Agusta A104 Helicar
- Agusta A105
- Agusta A106
- Agusta A109
- Agusta A115
- Agusta A119 Koala
- Agusta A129 Mangusta
- Agusta AB.102
- Agusta AZ.101G

=== AgustaWestland ===
- AgustaWestland AW101
- AgustaWestland AW109
- AgustaWestland AW109 Grand
- AgustaWestland AW119 Koala
- AgustaWestland AW139
- AgustaWestland AW149
- AgustaWestland AW159
- AgustaWestland AW169
- AgustaWestland AW189
- AgustaWestland CH-149 Cormorant

=== Air & Space ===
- Air & Space 18A Flymobil

=== Air Command ===
- Air Command Commander
- Air Command Commander 147A
- Air Command Commander Elite
- Air Command Commander Side-By-Side
- Air Command Commander Sport
- Air Command Commander Tandem
- Air Command Tandem

=== Airbus Helicopters ===
- Airbus Helicopters H140
- Airbus Helicopters H160
- Airbus Helicopters H175
- Airbus Helicopters X6

=== Airmaster Helicopters ===
- Airmaster H2-B1

=== Amax Engineering ===
- Amax Double Eagle TT
- Amax Eagle
- Amax Eagle TT

==== American Air Jet ====
- American Air Jet American

=== American Aircraft International ===
- AAI Penetrator

=== American Helicopter ===
- A-6 Buck Private
- XA-5 Top Sergeant
- XH-26 Jet Jeep

=== American Sportscopter ===
- American Sportscopter Ultrasport 254
- American Sportscopter Ultrasport 331
- American Sportscopter Ultrasport 496

=== Arrow Coax ===
- Arrow Coax Livella Uno

=== Auroa Helicopters ===
- Auroa Helicopters Auroa

=== AutoGyro ===
- AutoGyro Calidus
- AutoGyro Cavalon
- AutoGyro eCavalon
- AutoGyro MT-03

=== Aviaimpex ===
- Aviaimpex Angel

=== Avian ===
- Avian 2/180 Gyroplane

=== Avicopter ===
- Avicopter AC313
- Avicopter AC332
- Avicopter AC352

=== Avimech ===
- Avimech Dragonfly DF-1

=== Aviomania ===
- Aviomania Genesis Duo G2SA
- Aviomania Genesis Solo G1SA

== B ==
=== Bell Boeing ===
- Quad TiltRotor
- V-22 Osprey

=== Bell Helicopter Textron ===
- Bell 30
- Bell 47, 47J
- Bell 48
- Bell 61
- Bell 201
- Bell 204/205
- Bell 206
- Bell 207
- Bell 212
- Bell 214, 214ST
- Bell 222/230
- Bell 309
- Bell 360
- Bell 407
  - Bell ARH-70
- Bell 409
- Bell 412
- Bell 427
- Bell 429
- Bell 430
- Bell 505
- Bell 525
- Bell AH-1G, W, Z
- Bell D-292
- Bell LHX
- Bell OH-58
- Bell UH-1
- Bell UH-1N, Y
- Bell V-247
- Bell V-280
- Bell X-22
- Bell XV-3
- Bell XV-15

=== Bensen ===
- Bensen B-6
- Bensen B-8
- Bensen B-9
- Bensen B-10
- Bensen B-12
- Bensen Mid-Jet

=== Boeing ===
- Boeing Model 360
- Boeing Vertol CH-46 Sea Knight
- Boeing CH-47 Chinook
- Boeing Vertol YUH-61
- Boeing Vertol XCH-62/XCH-62 HLH
- Boeing AH-64 Apache
- Boeing–Sikorsky RAH-66 Comanche
- Boeing X-50 Dragonfly
- SkyHook JHL-40
- Sikorsky–Boeing SB-1 Defiant

=== Borgward ===
- Borgward Kolibri

=== Brantly ===
- Brantly B-2
- Brantly 305

=== Bratukhin ===
- Bratukhin B-5
- Bratukhin B-11
- Bratukhin Omega

=== Brennan ===
- Brennan Helicopter

=== Breguet ===
- Breguet G.11E
- Breguet-Richet Gyroplane
- Gyroplane Laboratoire

=== Bristol Aeroplane Company ===
- Bristol Belvedere
- Bristol Sycamore

=== Buhl Aircraft Company ===
- Buhl A-1 Autogyro

== C ==
=== Calumet Motorsports ===
- Calumet Snobird Explorer

=== Canadian Home Rotors ===
- Canadian Home Rotors Safari

=== Celier Aviation ===
- Celier Kiss
- Celier Xenon 2
- Celier Xenon 4

=== Cessna ===
- Cessna CH-1

=== Changhe Aircraft Industries Corporation ===
- Changhe Z-8
- Changhe Z-10
- Changhe Z-11
- Changhe Z-18

=== Chu ===
- Chu CJC-3
- Chu Hummingbird

=== Cicaré Helicópteros S.A. ===
- Cicaré CH-7
- Cicaré CH-14
- Cicaré CK.1

=== Cierva Autogiro Company ===
- Cierva C.1
- Cierva C.2
- Cierva C.3
- Cierva C.4
- Cierva C.6
- Cierva C.8
- Cierva C.9
- Cierva C.12
- Cierva C.17
- Cierva C.19
- Cierva C.24
- Cierva C.29
- Cierva C.30A
- Cierva C.40
- Cierva CR Twin
- Cierva W.5
- Cierva W.9
- Cierva W.11 Air Horse

=== Citroën ===
- Citroën RE-2

=== Clout ===
- Clout Mechanical Air-Ship

=== Continental Copters ===
- El Tomcat

=== Cornu ===
- Cornu helicopter (1907)

=== Council for Scientific and Industrial Research ===
- CSIR Experimental Autogyro II

=== Craft Aerotech ===
- Craft Aerotech 200

== D ==
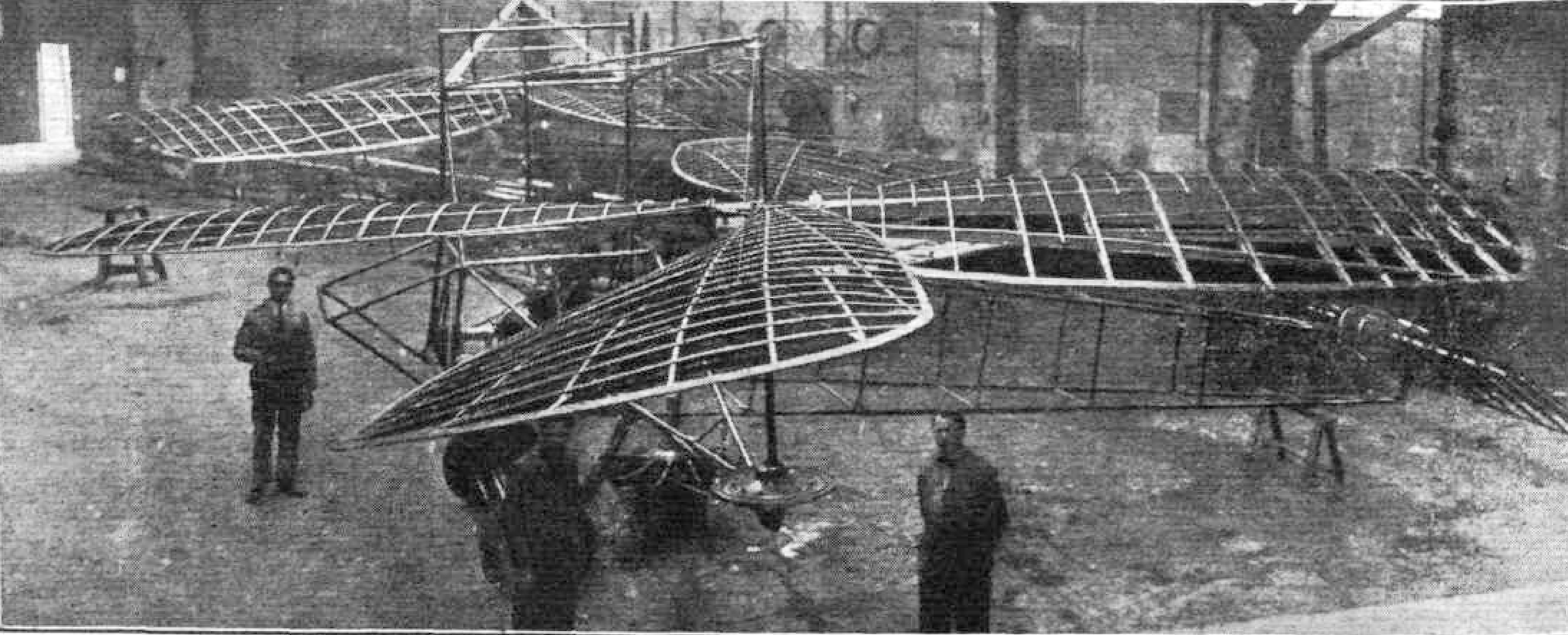
The Damblanc–Lacoin Alérion helicopter under construction

=== Denel Aeronautics ===
- Denel Oryx
- Denel Rooivalk
- Denel XH-1 Alpha
- Denel XTP-1 Beta

=== DF Helicopters ===
- DF334

=== Doak ===
- Doak VZ-4

=== Doman ===
- Doman LZ-5

=== Dornier Flugzeugwerke ===
- Dornier Do 32
- Dornier Do 132

=== DTA sarl ===
- DTA J-RO

=== Dynali Helicopter ===
- Dynali H2S
- Dynali H3 Easyflyer

== E ==
=== Eagle ===
- Eagle Helicycle

=== Eagle's Perch ===
- Eagle's Perch

=== EDM Aerotec ===
- EDM Aerotec CoAX 2D/2R

=== ELA Aviación ===
- ELA 07
- ELA 09 Junior
- ELA 10 Eclipse

=== Engineering System ===
- Engineering System Gen H-4

=== Enstrom ===
- Enstrom 480
- Enstrom F-28 / 280

=== Eurocopter Group ===
- Eurocopter BK-117
- Eurocopter Colibri
- Eurocopter Cougar
- Eurocopter Dauphin
- Eurocopter EC 130
- Eurocopter EC 135
- Eurocopter EC 145
- Eurocopter EC 155
- Eurocopter EC 175
- Eurocopter EC 225
- Eurocopter EC 635
- Eurocopter EC 725
- Eurocopter Ecureuil
- Eurocopter Fennec
- Eurocopter Panther
- Eurocopter Super Puma
- Eurocopter Tiger
- Eurocopter UH-72 Lakota
- Eurocopter X3

== F ==
=== Fairchild Hiller ===
- Fairchild Hiller FH-1100

=== Fairey Aviation ===
- Fairey Ultra-light Helicopter
- Gyrodyne
- Jet Gyrodyne
- Rotodyne

=== Farrington Aircraft ===
- Farrington Twinstar

=== Fiat ===
- Fiat 7002

=== Filper ===
- Filper Beta 200

=== Firestone Aircraft Company ===
- Firestone 45

=== Flettner ===
- Flettner Fl 184
- Flettner Fl 185
- Flettner Fl 265
- Flettner Fl 282

=== Florine ===
- Florine Helicopter No.3

=== Focke-Achgelis ===
- Focke-Achgelis Fa 223

=== Focke-Wulf ===
- Focke-Wulf Fw 61

=== Freewind Aviation ===
- Freewind Bumble B

== G ==
=== Gadfly Aircraft ===
- Gadfly HDW.1

=== Gazda ===
- Gazda Helicospeeder

=== GEN Corporation ===
- GEN H-4

=== German Gyro Safety Aviation ===
- German Gyro Matto

=== Gluhareff ===
- Gluhareff EMG-300
- Gluhareff MEG-1X
- Gluhareff MEG-2X
- Gluhareff MEG-3X

=== Groen Brothers Aviation ===
- Groen Hawk H4

=== Guépard II Team ===
- Guépard II XJ01

=== Gyrodyne Company of America ===
- Gyrodyne DSN DASH
- Gyrodyne RON Rotorcycle

== H ==
=== Hafner ===
- Hafner A.R.III Gyroplane
- Hafner Rotabuggy

=== Harbin Aircraft Manufacturing Corporation ===
- Harbin Z-5
- Harbin Z-6
- Harbin Z-9
- Harbin Z-15
- Harbin Z-19
- Harbin Z-20

=== Heli-Sport ===
- Heli-Sport CH-7 Angel
- Heli-Sport CH77 Ranabot

=== Helicopter Engineering Research Corporation ===
- Jovanovich JOV-3

=== Hélicoptères Guimbal ===
- Guimbal Cabri G2

=== Helowerks ===
- Helowerks HX-1 Wasp

=== Higgins ===
- Higgins EB-1

=== Hillberg Helicopters ===
- Hillberg EH1-01 RotorMouse
- Hillberg Turbine Exec

=== Hiller Aircraft Corporation ===
- Hiller HJ-1/YH-32
- Hiller ROE Rotorcycle
- Hiller Ten99
- Hiller UH-12/OH-23
- Hiller VZ-1 Pawnee
- Hiller X-18

=== Hindustan Aeronautics Limited ===
- HAL Cheetah
- HAL Chetak
- HAL Dhruv
- HAL Light Utility Helicopter
- HAL Prachand
- HAL Rudra

=== Hoppi-copter ===
- Pentecost HX-1 Hoppi-Copter

=== Hughes Helicopters ===
- AH-64 Apache
- Hughes XH-17 Flying Crane
- Hughes-McDonnell XV-9 "Hot Cycle"
- OH-6 Cayuse
- TH-55 Osage

=== Hungaro Copter Limited ===
- Hungaro Copter

== I ==
=== Industria Aeronautică Română ===
- IAR 316
- IAR 330

=== Innovator Technologies ===
- Innovator Mosquito Air
- Innovator Mosquito XE

=== Irkut ===
- Irkut A-002

=== Italian Rotors Industries ===
- IRI T22B
- IRI T250A

== K ==
=== KAI ===
- Surion

=== Kaman Aircraft ===
- Kaman HH-43
- Kaman K-16
- Kaman K 225
- Kaman K-1125 "Huskie III"
- Kaman KSA-100 SAVER
- Kaman K1200 K-Max
- Kaman SH-2

=== Kamov ===
- Kamov Ka-8
- Kamov Ka-10
- Kamov Ka-15
- Kamov Ka-18
- Kamov Ka-20
- Kamov Ka-22
- Kamov Ka-25
- Kamov Ka-26
- Kamov Ka-27/28/29/32
- Kamov Ka-31
- Kamov Ka-37
- Kamov Ka-40
- Kamov Ka-50/52
- Kamov Ka-60
- Kamov Ka-90
- Kamov Ka-92
- Kamov Ka-115
- Kamov Ka-118
- Kamov Ka-126
- Kamov Ka-137
- Kamov Ka-226
- Kamov V-100

=== Kawasaki Heavy Industries ===
- Kawasaki BK 117
- Kawasaki KH-4
- Kawasaki OH-1

=== Kayaba Industry ===
- Kayaba Ka-1

=== Kazan Helicopter Plant ===
- Kazan Ansat

=== Kellett ===
- Kellett K-2/3/4
- Kellett KD-1
- Kellett R-8
- Kellett R-10

=== Kharkiv Aviation Institute ===
- KhAI-24

=== Kinney ===
- Kinney HRH

=== Konner Srl ===
- Konner K1

== L ==
=== Lada Land ===
- Lada Land VM-01

=== LAE Helicopters Cyprus ===
- LAE Ultrasport 496T

=== Landgraf Helicopter Company ===
- Landgraf H-2

=== Léger ===
- Léger machine

=== Leineweber ===
- Leineweber 1921 Helicopter

=== Leonardo Helicopters ===
- Leonardo Proteus

=== Little Wing Autogyros, Inc. ===
- Little Wing LW-1
- Little Wing Roto-Pup

=== Lockheed ===
- Lockheed AH-56 Cheyenne
- Lockheed CL-475
- Lockheed Martin VH-71 Kestrel
- Lockheed XH-51

== M ==
=== Manzolini ===
- Manzolini Libellula

=== Marenco Swisshelicopter ===
- SKYe SH09

=== MATRA ===
- MATRA-Cantinieau MC-101

=== McCulloch Autogyro ===
- McCulloch J-2

=== McDonnell ===
- McDonnell XV-1

=== McDonnell Douglas ===
- MD 500
- MD 500 Defender
- MD 600
- MD Explorer
- MH-6 Little Bird

=== Messerschmitt-Bölkow-Blohm ===
- Bölkow Bo 46
- Bölkow Bo 102 Heli Trainer
- Bölkow Bo 103
- MBB Bo 105
- MBB/Kawasaki BK 117

=== Midwest Engineering & Design ===
- Midwest Hornet
- Midwest Zodiac Talon-Turbine

=== Mil Helicopters ===
- Mil Mi-1
- Mil Mi-2
- Mil Mi-4
- Mil Mi-6
- Mil Mi-8
- Mil Mi-10
- Mil Mi-12
- Mil Mi-14
- Mil Mi-17
- Mil Mi-24/25/35
- Mil Mi-26
- Mil Mi-28
- Mil Mi-30
- Mil Mi-34
- Mil Mi-36
- Mil Mi-38
- Mil Mi-52
- Mil Mi-X1 (Mi-Kh1)
- Mil V-7
- Mil V-16

=== Millennium Helicopter ===
- Millennium MH-1

=== Mitsubishi Heavy Industries ===
- Mitsubishi MH2000

== N ==
=== Nagler ===
- Nagler NH-160

=== NASA/JPL ===
- Mars Helicopter Ingenuity

=== Nederlandse Helikopter Industrie ===
- NHI H-3 Kolibrie

=== NHIndustries ===
- NHI NH90

=== Niki Rotor Aviation ===
- Niki 2004
- Niki Kallithea
- Niki Lightning

=== Nord ===
- Nord N.1700

=== Northrop Grumman ===
- MQ-8 Fire Scout

=== Nova Sp. z.o.o. ===
- Nova Coden

== O ==
=== Ortego ===
- Ortego Helicopter

== P ==
=== PANHA ===
- Panha 2091

=== Pawnee Aviation ===
- Pawnee Chief
- Pawnee Warrior

=== Petróczy-Kármán-Žurovec ===
- PKZ-1

=== Philippine Aerospace Development Corporation ===
- PADC Hummingbird

=== Phoenix Rotorcraft ===
- Phoenix Skyblazer

=== Piasecki Helicopter ===
- Piasecki 59 Airgeep
- Piasecki H-16 Pathfinder
- Piasecki H-21
- Piasecki HRP-1
- Piasecki HUP
- Piasecki PA-97
- Piasecki PV-2
- Piasecki X-49

=== Pitcairn ===
- Pitcairn PA-18
- Pitcairn PA-19
- Pitcairn PAA-1
- Pitcairn PCA-2

=== Platt-LePage Aircraft Co ===
- Platt-LePage XR-1

=== PZL ===
- PZL Kania
- PZL SM-4 Latka
- PZL SW-4
- PZL W-3 Sokół

== R ==
=== Raven Rotorcraft ===
- Raven Explorer I
- Raven Explorer II

=== Redback Aviation ===
- Redback Buzzard

=== Revolution Helicopter Corporation ===
- Revolution Mini-500

=== Robinson Helicopter ===
- Robinson R22
- Robinson R44
- Robinson R66

=== Rotorcraft Ltd ===
- Cierva CR-Twin

=== Rotorschmiede ===
- Rotorschmiede VA115

=== RotorSport UK Ltd ===
- RotorSport UK Calidus
- RotorSport UK MT-03

=== RotorWay International ===
- RotorWay 300T Eagle
- RotorWay A600 Talon
- RotorWay Elite
- RotorWay Exec 162F
- RotorWay Scorpion

=== Rotorwing-Aero ===
- Rotorwing-Aero 3D-RV

=== Russian Gyroplanes ===
- Russian Gyroplanes Gyros-1 Farmer
- Russian Gyroplanes Gyros-2 Smartflier

== S ==
=== Santos-Dumont ===
- Santos-Dumont helicopter

=== Saunders ===
- Saunders Helicogyre

=== Saunders Roe ===
- Saro P.531
- Saro Skeeter

=== Scheutzow ===
- Scheutzow B

=== Schweizer Aircraft Corporation ===
- Schweizer 300
- Schweizer 330/333

=== Shaanxi Baojii Special Vehicles Manufacturing Company ===
- Shaanxi Baojii Special Vehicles Lie Ying Falcon

=== Shahed Aviation Industries Research Center ===
- HESA Shahed 278
- HESA Shahed 285

=== Showers-Aero ===
- Showers Skytwister Choppy

=== Sikorsky Aircraft Corporation ===
- Vought-Sikorsky VS-300
- Sikorsky CH-37 Mojave
- Sikorsky CH-53 Sea Stallion
- Sikorsky CH-53E Super Stallion
- Sikorsky CH-53K King Stallion
  - Sikorsky MH-53 Pave Low
- Sikorsky CH-54 Tarhe
- Sikorsky S-64 Skycrane
- Sikorsky Cypher
- Sikorsky H-19 (S-55)
- Sikorsky H-34 (S-58)
- Sikorsky R-4
- Sikorsky R-5/H-5
- Sikorsky R-6
- Sikorsky S-52
- Sikorsky S-60
- Sikorsky HH-52 Seaguard (S-62)
- Sikorsky S-67 Blackhawk
- Sikorsky S-69
- Sikorsky S-70
  - Sikorsky UH-60 Black Hawk
  - Sikorsky HH-60 Pave Hawk
  - Sikorsky SH-60 Seahawk
  - Sikorsky MH-60 Jayhawk
- Sikorsky S-72
- Sikorsky S-73
- Sikorsky S-75
- Sikorsky S-76
- Sikorsky S-92
  - CH-148 Cyclone
- Sikorsky S-97 Raider
- Sikorsky UH-3 Sea King
- Sikorsky X2
- Sikorsky XH-39
- Boeing–Sikorsky RAH-66 Comanche

=== Silvercraft Italiana ===
- Silvercraft SH-4

=== SKT Swiss Kopter Technology SA ===
- SKT Skyrider 06

=== SkyCruiser Autogyro ===
- SkyCruiser Autogyro SkyCruiser

=== SNCAC ===
- SNCAC NC.2001

=== SNCASE ===
- SNCASE SE-3110

=== SNCASO ===
- Sud-Ouest Ariel
- Sud-Ouest Djinn

=== Spitfire Helicopter Company ===
- Spitfire Helicopters Spitfire Mk.I
- Spitfire Helicopters Spitfire Mk.II Tigershark

=== Star Aviation Inc. ===
- Star Aviation LoneStar Sport Helicopter

=== Sznycer ===
- Sznycer Omega BS-12
- Sznycer SG-VI-D

== T ==
=== Tervamäki ===
(Jukka Tervamäki)

- Tervamäki JT-1
- Tervamäki JT-2
- Tervamäki-Eerola ATE-3
- Tervamäki JT-5

=== Titanium Auto Gyro ===
- Titanium Explorer

=== Transcendental Aircraft Corporation ===
- Transcendental 1-G

=== Trendak ===
- Trendak Tercel

=== Trixy Aviation Products ===
- Trixy G 4-2 R
- Trixy Liberty
- Trixy Princess
- Trixy Trixformer

=== TsAGI ===
- TsAGI A-4

=== Turkish Aerospace Industries ===
- TAI/AgustaWestland T-129
- TAI T-625

== V ==
=== Vertical ===
- Vertical Hummingbird

=== Villamil ===
- Villamil Libélula Viblandi

=== Volocopter ===
- Volocopter 2X
- Volocopter VC2

=== Vortech ===
- Vortech A/W 95
- Vortech Choppy
- Vortech G-1
- Vortech Hot Rod
- Vortech Kestrel Jet
- Vortech Meg-2XH Strap-On
- Vortech Shadow
- Vortech Skylark
- Vortech Sparrow

== W ==
=== Wagner ===
- Wagner Aerocar

=== Westland Helicopters ===
- Westland 30
- Westland Apache
- Westland Dragonfly
- Westland Lynx
- Westland Sea King
- Westland Scout
- Westland Wasp
- Westland Wessex
- Westland Westminster
- Westland Whirlwind
- Westland Widgeon

=== Windspire Inc. ===
- Windspire Aeros

=== Winner SBS ===
- Winner B150

=== Wombat Gyrocopters ===
- Wombat Gyrocopters Wombat

== Y ==
=== Yakovlev ===
- Yakovlev EG
- Yakovlev VVP-6
- Yakovlev Yak-24
- Yakovlev Yak-60
- Yakovlev Yak-100

=== Youngcopter ===
- Youngcopter Neo

== Notes ==
US Army helicopters designations:

- AH: Attack Helicopter
- CH: Cargo Helicopter
- OH: Observation Helicopter
- RAH: Reconnaissance and Attack Helicopter
- UH: Utility Helicopter

=== Project acronyms ===
- AAH: Advanced Attack Helicopter

== See also ==
- List of helicopter airlines
- List of tilt-rotor craft
- List of United States military helicopters
- List of utility helicopters
