= Coden =

Coden may refer to:

- Coden, Alabama, an American fishing village
- Nova Coden, a Polish autogyro design
- CODEN, a bibliographic identifier
- Francille Rusan Coden, American historian

== See also ==
- Koden (disambiguation)
- Codeine (disambiguation)
