= Clout =

Clout may refer to:

== Music ==
- Clout (band), a South African rock group
- Clout, a 2006 album by Noah23
- "Clout" (song), a 2019 song by Offset
- "Clout", a song by Ty Dolla Sign from the 2018 album Beach House 3

== Other uses ==
- Clout (nail), used for attaching sheet material to wooden frames
- Clout (radio show), United States
- Clout archery, in which arrows are shot at a distant flag
- Clout Mechanical Air-Ship, a 1903 British helicopter
- Market clout
- Power (social and political)

== See also ==
- Klout, a website measuring social influence
