= Windspire =

Windspire may refer to:

- Windspire Inc., a defunct American aircraft design firm based in Long Green, Maryland
- Windspire Energy, an American manufacturer of wind turbines and solar arrays, located in Reedsburg, Wisconsin
