= Tercel =

Tercel may refer to:

- Tercel, a dated term for a male falcon
- Toyota Tercel, a Japanese car (built 1978–1999)
- Trendak Tercel, a Polish rotorcraft (built since 2014)
- USS Tercel (AM-386), an American warship (launched 1944)
