= Continental Copters Jet-Cat =

JC-1 Jet-Cat

General information
- Type: Agricultural helicopter
- Manufacturer: Continental Copters

History
- Manufactured: 1
- First flight: 1978

The Continental Copters JC-1 Jet-Cat was an agricultural helicopter developed in the United States in the 1970s. Following the success that Continental Copters had enjoyed in converting Bell 47 airframes into specialized agricultural machines as the El Tomcat, the firm embarked on a project of creating a turbine-powered equivalent by converting a Bell 206. Like the El Tomcat, the Jet-Cat was to be only a single-seat aircraft with a fuselage radically reconfigured from its original design. The Jet-Cat was also equipped to carry slung loads.

Work began in 1976, but was soon interrupted in favour of a similar project to transform a Bell 204. Development of the Jet-Cat resumed the following year, and the aircraft (registration N9097T) made its first flight early in 1978. Shortly thereafter, Continental Copters ceased business and no further development took place.
