= Windspire Aeros =

American helicopter

General information
- Type: Helicopter
- National origin: United States
- Manufacturer: Windspire Inc.
- Status: Plans no longer available
- Number built: 3 (1998)

The Windspire Aeros is an American helicopter that was designed and produced by Windspire Inc. of Long Green, Maryland. Now out of production, when it was available the aircraft was supplied in the form of plans for amateur construction.

== Design and development ==
The Aeros was designed to comply with the US Experimental - Amateur-built aircraft rules. It features a single main rotor, a two-bladed tail rotor, a single-seat enclosed cockpit with a bubble canopy and skid-type landing gear with integral ground-handling wheels. The standard engine used is a four-cylinder, air-cooled, four-stroke, 97 hp (72 kW) Volkswagen air-cooled engine.

The aircraft fuselage is made from a mix of aluminum and steel tubing. Its 22.0 ft (6.7 m) diameter two-bladed rotor has a chord of 8 in (20.3 cm) and employs a NACA 0012 airfoil. The drive train consists of a primary belt drive connected to a geared transmission built with Volkswagen gears and a belt-driven tail rotor drive. The tail rotor has a diameter of 40 in (101.6 cm) and a chord of 3.5 in (8.9 cm).

The aircraft has an empty weight of 540 lb (245 kg) and a gross weight of 900 lb (408 kg), giving a useful load of 360 lb (163 kg). With full fuel of 12 U.S. gallons (45 L; 10.0 imp gal) the payload for crew and baggage is 288 lb (131 kg). The cabin width is 20 in (51 cm).

The supplied plans include a fully illustrated guidebook and a parts list. The manufacturer estimates the construction time from the supplied plans as 300 hours.

== Operational history ==
By 1998 the company reported that 40 sets of plans had been sold and three aircraft were completed and flying.

By April 2015 no examples had been registered in the United States with the Federal Aviation Administration.

== Specifications (Aeros) ==
Data from Purdy and All-Aero

General characteristics

- Crew: one
- Length: 18 ft 0 in (5.49 m)
- Width: 5 ft 0 in (1.52 m)
- Height: 7 ft 0 in (2.13 m)
- Airfoil: NACA 0012
- Empty weight: 540 lb (245 kg)
- Gross weight: 900 lb (408 kg)
- Fuel capacity: 12 U.S. gallons (45 L; 10.0 imp gal)
- Powerplant: 1 × Volkswagen air-cooled engine four cylinder, air-cooled, four stroke automotive conversion engine, 97 hp (72 kW)
- Main rotor diameter: 22 ft 0 in (6.71 m)
- Main rotor area: 380 sq ft (35 m^{2})

Performance

- Maximum speed: 85 mph (137 km/h, 74 kn)
- Cruise speed: 60 mph (97 km/h, 52 kn)
- Range: 65 mi (105 km, 56 nmi)
- Service ceiling: 12,000 ft (3,700 m)
- Rate of climb: 950 ft/min (4.8 m/s)
- Disk loading: 2.4 lb/sq ft (12 kg/m^{2})

== See also ==
- List of rotorcraft
