= Gazda =

Gazda is a surname. Notable people include:

- Adam Gazda (born 1987), American soccer player
- Daniel Gazda (born 1997), Czech ice hockey player
- István Gazda (1927–2006), Hungarian philatelist
- Stanisław Gazda (1938–2020), Polish cyclist
