= Rotorwing-Aero 3D-RV =

American autogyro

3D-RV

General information
- Type: Autogyro
- National origin: United States
- Manufacturer: Rotorwing-Aero
- Designer: Monte Hoskins
- Status: Production completed
- Number built: Three (1998)

History
- First flight: 1989

The Rotorwing-Aero 3D-RV is an American autogyro that was designed by Monte Hoskins and produced by Rotorwing-Aero of Salt Lake City, Utah, introduced in 1989. Now out of production, when it was available the aircraft was supplied in the form of plans for amateur construction.

== Design and development ==
The 3D-RV was designed to comply with the US FAR 103 Ultralight Vehicles rules, including the category's maximum empty weight of 254 lb (115 kg). The aircraft has a standard empty weight of 250 lb (113 kg) when equipped with a Rotax 503 or Rotax 582 engine. With heavier engines it can be registered in the US Experimental - Amateur-built category.

The 3D-RV features a single main rotor, a single-seat open cockpit without a windshield, tricycle landing gear with hydraulic disk brakes, plus a tail caster. The acceptable power range is 50 to 65 hp (37 to 48 kW) and the standard engines used are twin cylinder, air-cooled, two-stroke, single-ignition 50 hp (37 kW) Rotax 503 engine and the twin cylinder, liquid-cooled, two-stroke, single-ignition 64 hp (48 kW) Rotax 582 engine, mounted in pusher configuration.

The aircraft fuselage is made from bolted-together aluminum tubing and welded 4130 steel tubing. Its two-bladed rotor has a diameter of 25 ft (7.6 m) and may use either manufactured metal blades or homemade Gyrotor wooden blades. The prototype was originally flown with wooden blades of 8 ft (2.4 m) each, with a 5 ft (1.5 m) hub bar, for a diameter of 21 ft (6.4 m). In this configuration the aircraft flew acceptably, but did not climb well on hot days at higher density altitudes. The minimum control speed is 10 mph (16 km/h)

The initial propeller used was a 64 in (163 cm) two bladed ground adjustable unit, but the plans specify a three-bladed ground adjustable design of 56 in (142 cm) diameter.

The prototype used a conventional low landing gear design, but this was later developed into a high landing gear to set the vertical center of gravity to the prob hub height to prevent longitudinal stability issues and bunt "push-over" accidents. The final design features a tall aluminium rudder.

The aircraft has a typical empty weight of 250 lb (110 kg) and a gross weight of 550 lb (250 kg), giving a useful load of 300 lb (140 kg). With full fuel of 5 U.S. gallons (19 L; 4.2 imp gal) the payload for the pilot and baggage is 270 lb (120 kg).

The standard day, sea level, no wind, take off roll with a 50 hp (37 kW) engine is 1,000 ft (305 m).

The manufacturer estimated the construction time from the supplied plans as 400 hours.

== Operational history ==
By 1998 the company reported that 35 sets of plans had been sold and three aircraft were completed and flying.

One builder reported an eight-month completion time.

== Specifications (3D-RV) ==
Data from Purdy

General characteristics

- Crew: one
- Length: 8 ft 6 in (2.59 m)
- Empty weight: 250 lb (113 kg)
- Gross weight: 550 lb (249 kg)
- Fuel capacity: 5 U.S. gallons (19 L; 4.2 imp gal)
- Powerplant: 1 × Rotax 912ULS four cylinder, liquid and air-cooled, four stroke aircraft engine, 100 hp (75 kW)
- Main rotor diameter: 25 ft 0 in (7.62 m)
- Propellers: 3-bladed three bladed ground adjustable

Performance

- Maximum speed: 75 mph (121 km/h, 65 kn)
- Cruise speed: 50 mph (80 km/h, 43 kn)
- Range: 80 mi (130 km, 70 nmi)
- Service ceiling: 8,000 ft (2,400 m)
- Rate of climb: 800 ft/min (4.1 m/s)

== See also ==
- List of rotorcraft
