= Pawnee Chief =

American light helicopter produced 2005-2008

Chief

General information
- Type: Helicopter
- National origin: United States
- Manufacturer: Pawnee Aviation
- Status: Production completed (2008)
- Number built: At least three

History
- First flight: December 2005
- Developed from: Pawnee Warrior

The Pawnee Chief is an American helicopter that was designed and produced by Pawnee Aviation of Longmont, Colorado and later McCook, Nebraska. It was first flown in December 2005. Now out of production, when it was available the aircraft was supplied as a kit for amateur construction.

== Design and development ==
The Chief was designed to comply with the US Experimental - Amateur-built aircraft rules. It features a single main rotor, a two-bladed tail rotor, two or three-seats-in side-by-side configuration in an enclosed cockpit with a windshield and skid-type landing gear. The standard engine used is a V-8, liquid-cooled, four-stroke, Chevrolet automotive racing powerplant of 355 hp (265 kW) derated to 306 hp (228 kW). The aircraft fuselage is made from welded 4130 steel tubing with a composite cockpit fairing. Its 30 ft (9.1 m) diameter two-bladed rotor is made from carbon-fiber-reinforced polymer. The aircraft has an empty weight of 1,520 lb (689 kg) and a gross weight of 2,400 lb (1,089 kg), giving a useful load of 880 lb (399 kg). With full fuel of 32 U.S. gallons (120 L; 27 imp gal) the aircraft has a payload for crew and baggage of 688 lb (312 kg). The cabin width is 58 in (147 cm).

The Chief was the subject of a protracted development time line. The company explained the long development, "we were determined not to put a product on the market before its time. We have seen other kits sold that did not complete their development and testing. Their customers paid for completion of the development and in reality did much of their testing.. By delaying our availability project until it was truly completed, we will avoid placing unnecessary a lot of "Airworthiness Directives" and flight restrictions on our aircraft."

In December 2005 first kit delivery was forecast for as early as January 2006, with a production rate of eight to ten per month and a first-year production of 50 to 60 kits expected for 2006. In 2005 when the aircraft first flew the company reported having "700 interested customers". The manufacturer estimated the construction time from the supplied kit as 150–200 hours.

The company seems to have gone out of business in late 2008.

== Operational history ==
By April 2015 two examples were registered in the United States with the Federal Aviation Administration, although both registrations had expired. A total of three Chiefs had been registered at one time.

On 28 September 2006 a Chief crashed while hovering, with minor injuries to the pilot and passenger. The National Transportation Safety Board report stated, "The amateur built helicopter impacted the ground during a test flight following the failure of a welded joint at a cyclic control cable bracket resulting in a loss of control authority. A post impact fire ensued, destroying the helicopter. The pilot reported he was in a low hover when the tail came up and the helicopter tilted. One of the skids subsequently caught the ground causing the helicopter to roll over. Examination of the helicopter revealed that a welded joint failed at a cyclic control cable bracket on the main rotor mast. Failure of the welded bracket caused the loss of input control authority from the cyclic control to the main rotor."

== Specifications (Chief) ==
Data from Manufacturer and Aero News Network

General characteristics

- Crew: one
- Capacity: one passenger in a bucket seat or two passengers on a bench seat
- Length: 32 ft 3 in (9.83 m)
- Height: 8 ft 2 in (2.49 m)
- Empty weight: 1,520 lb (689 kg)
- Gross weight: 2,400 lb (1,089 kg)
- Fuel capacity: 32 U.S. gallons (120 L; 27 imp gal)
- Powerplant: 1 × Chevrolet V-8, liquid-cooled, four-stroke, Chevrolet automotive racing powerplant, 306 hp (228 kW)
- Main rotor diameter: 30 ft 0 in (9.14 m)
- Main rotor area: 706 sq ft (65.6 m^{2})

Performance

- Cruise speed: 85 mph (137 km/h, 74 kn)
- Range: 250 mi (400 km, 220 nmi)
- Service ceiling: 10,000 ft (3,000 m)
- Rate of climb: 1,000 ft/min (5.1 m/s)
- Disk loading: 3.4 lb/sq ft (17 kg/m^{2})

== See also ==
- List of rotorcraft
