= Helowerks HX-1 Wasp =

HX-1 Wasp
- Helowerks HX-1 in flight

General information
- Type: Ultralight homebuilt helicopter
- National origin: United States
- Manufacturer: Helowerks

History
- First flight: 2006

The Helowerks HX-1 is an American ultralight homebuilt helicopter designed by Helowerks based at Hampton in Virginia.

== Design and development ==
The Wasp is a traditional pod and boom helicopter with a twin-blade rotor powered by a 90shp (97 kW) Garrett JFS-100-13A turboshaft engine. It has a fixed skid landing gear and enclosed cabin with two-seat side-by-side seats. The Wasp design was started in 2001 and was exhibited unflown in 2005, it first flew around March 2006 after receiving FAA approval in the experimental category.

== Specifications ==
Data from Jane's All the World's Aircraft 2008-2009

General characteristics

- Crew: 2
- Length: 19 ft 0 in (5.79 m)
- Height: 8 ft 3 in (2.51 m)
- Empty weight: 700 lb (318 kg)
- Gross weight: 1,200 lb (544 kg)
- Powerplant: 1 × Garrett JFS-100-13A turboshaft engine , 15,048 lbf (66.94 kN) thrust
- Main rotor diameter: 23 ft 0 in (7.01 m)

Performance

- Maximum speed: 113 mph (182 km/h, 98 kn)
- Range: 127 mi (204 km, 110 nmi)
- Service ceiling: 10,000 ft (3,050 m)

== See also ==
Related lists

- List of rotorcraft
