= Aviomania G2SA Genesis Duo =

G2SA Genesis Duo

General information
- Type: Autogyro
- National origin: Cyprus
- Manufacturer: Aviomania
- Designer: Nicolas Karaolides
- Status: In production (2017)

History
- Introduction date: 2007
- Developed from: Aviomania Genesis Solo G1SA

The Aviomania G2SA Genesis Duo is a Cypriot autogyro designed in 2007 by Nicolas Karaolides and produced by Aviomania of Larnaca. The aircraft is supplied as a complete ready-to-fly-aircraft or as a kit for amateur construction.

== Design and development ==
The G2SA Genesis Duo features a single main rotor, a two-seats-in tandem open cockpit with a windshield, tricycle landing gear with wheel pants, plus a tail caster and a twin cylinder, air and liquid-cooled, four-stroke, dual-ignition, turbocharged 115 hp (86 kW) Rotax 914 engine in pusher configuration. Other engine options include the 50 hp (37 kW) Rotax 503 and the 100 hp (75 kW) Rotax 912 ULS.

The aircraft fuselage is made from bolted-together aluminum tubing and is equipped with a composite fairing. Its two-bladed rotor has a diameter of 9.1 m (29.9 ft) and a chord of 18 cm (7.1 in). The aircraft has a typical empty weight of 240 kg (529 lb) and a gross weight of 560 kg (1,235 lb), giving a useful load of 220 kg (485 lb). With full fuel of 80 litres (18 imp gal; 21 US gal) the payload for the pilot, passengers and baggage is 163 kg (359 lb).

The ready-to-fly version comes with the Rotax 503 as standard equipment. The kit version does not include the engine, propeller or main rotor pre-rotator.

== Specifications (G2SA Genesis Duo) ==
Data from Tacke

General characteristics

- Crew: one
- Capacity: one passenger
- Empty weight: 240 kg (529 lb)
- Gross weight: 560 kg (1,235 lb)
- Fuel capacity: a 50 litres (11 imp gal; 13 US gal) and a 30 litres (6.6 imp gal; 7.9 US gal) tank, for a total of 80 litres (18 imp gal; 21 US gal)
- Powerplant: 1 × Rotax 914 four cylinder, liquid and air-cooled, four stroke turbocharged aircraft engine, 86 kW (115 hp)
- Main rotor diameter: 9.1 m (29 ft 10 in)
- Main rotor area: 65 m^{2} (700 sq ft)
- Propellers: 4-bladed ground adjustable

Performance

- Maximum speed: 180 km/h (110 mph, 97 kn)
- Cruise speed: 150 km/h (93 mph, 81 kn)
- Rate of climb: 8 m/s (1,600 ft/min)
- Disk loading: 8.6 kg/m^{2} (1.8 lb/sq ft)

== See also ==
- List of rotorcraft
