= Prospect Hill (Long Green, Maryland) =

Historic house in Maryland, United States

- U.S. National Register of Historic Places
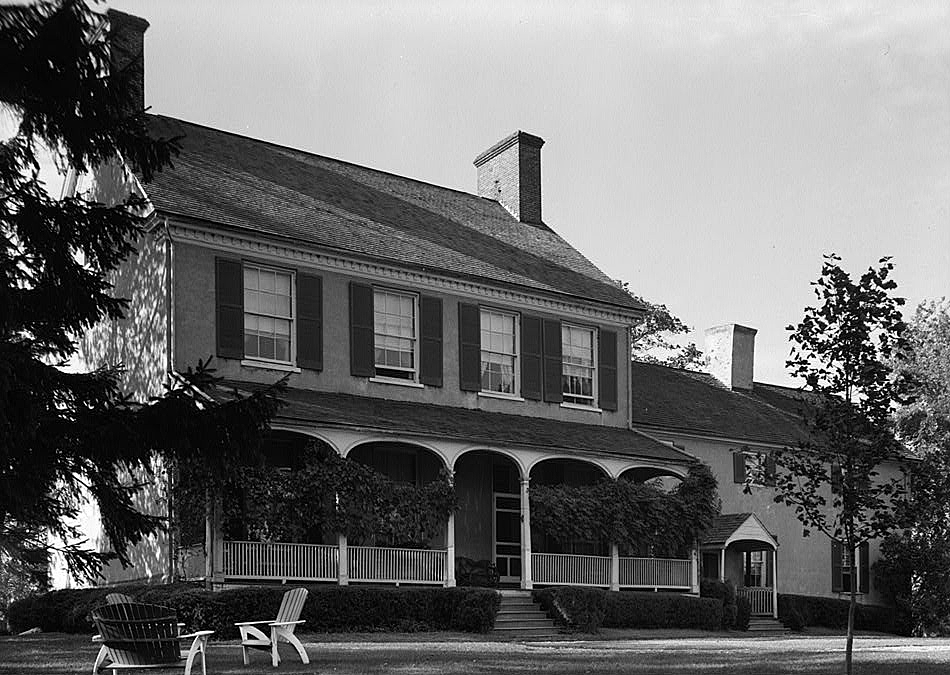
- Prospect Hill in 1936

- Location within Maryland Location within the United States
- Location: 12815 Kanes Road, Long Green, Maryland
- Coordinates: 39°28′48″N 76°30′47″W
- Area: 50 acres (20 ha)
- Built: 1796-1798
- Architect: Thornton, William
- Architectural style: Federal
- NRHP reference No.: 73000903
- Added to NRHP: July 26, 1973

Prospect Hill is a historic home located at Long Green, Baltimore County, Maryland, United States. It was designed by architect William Thornton and built between 1796 and 1798. It is a 2 1/2-story Federal style brick house.

Prospect Hill was listed on the National Register of Historic Places in 1973.
