= IRI T250A =

Italian helicopter

T250A

General information
- Type: Helicopter
- National origin: Italy
- Manufacturer: Italian Rotors Industries
- Status: Production completed (2016)

History
- Introduction date: 2015
- Developed from: IRI T22B

The IRI T250A is an Italian helicopter that was designed and produced by Italian Rotors Industries of Aprilia, Lazio and introduced in 2015. Now out of production, when it was available the aircraft was supplied complete and ready-to-fly.

The company seems to have been founded about 2013 and gone out of business in June 2016, ending production.

== Design and development ==
The T250A features a single main rotor and tail rotor, a two-seats-in side-by-side configuration enclosed cockpit with a windshield, skid landing gear and a 250 hp (186 kW) PBS TS 100 turboshaft engine made by PBS Velká Bíteš.

The aircraft fuselage is made from composites. Its two-bladed rotor has a diameter of 7.6 m (24.9 ft). The aircraft has a typical empty weight of 295 kg (650 lb) and a gross weight of 650 kg (1,433 lb), giving a useful load of 355 kg (783 lb). With full fuel of 130 litres (29 imp gal; 34 US gal) the payload for the crew, passenger and baggage is 261 kg (575 lb).

The aircraft was built to ISO 9001 and EN 9100 standards.

== Specifications (T250A) ==
Data from Tacke

General characteristics

- Crew: one
- Capacity: one passenger
- Empty weight: 295 kg (650 lb)
- Gross weight: 650 kg (1,433 lb)
- Fuel capacity: 130 litres (29 imp gal; 34 US gal)
- Powerplant: 1 × PBS TS 100 turboshaft engine, 190 kW (250 hp)
- Main rotor diameter: 7.6 m (24 ft 11 in)
- Main rotor area: 45 m^{2} (480 sq ft)

Performance

- Maximum speed: 195 km/h (121 mph, 105 kn)
- Cruise speed: 175 km/h (109 mph, 94 kn)
- Rate of climb: 11 m/s (2,200 ft/min)
- Disk loading: 14.4 kg/m^{2} (2.9 lb/sq ft)

== See also ==
- List of rotorcraft
