= American Air Jet American =

American

General information
- Type: Homebuilt helicopter
- National origin: United States
- Manufacturer: American Air Jet

History
- First flight: 1988

The American Air Jet American is an American homebuilt tip jet helicopter designed and built by American Air Jet of Woodland Park, Colorado for amateur construction from kits.

== Design and development ==
The American is either a tandem two-seat or single seat helicopter first flown in July 1988. It has an aluminium alloy enclosed cockpit with a twin skid landing gear and non-moving tail surfaces. The American has a twin-blade single rotor made from glassfibre and no tail rotor, on the prototype a 280 hp (209 kW) Wankel rotary engine drives a centrifugal compressor that provides air to thrust jets on the tips of the blades.

== Specifications (Prototype) ==
Data from Jane's All the World's Aircraft 1989-90

General characteristics

- Crew: 1
- Length: 18 ft 0 in (5.49 m)
- Height: 8 ft 0 in (2.44 m)
- Empty weight: 980 lb (445 kg)
- Gross weight: 1,600 lb (726 kg)
- Powerplant: 1 × Wankel rotary engine , 208 hp (109 kW)
- Main rotor diameter: 36 ft 0 in (10.97 m)

Performance

- Maximum speed: 90 mph (145 km/h, 78 kn)
- Cruise speed: 70 mph (113 km/h, 61 kn)
- Range: 300 mi (483 km, 260 nmi)
- Service ceiling: 10,000 ft (3,050 m)

== See also ==
Related lists

- List of rotorcraft
