= IRI T22B =

Italian helicopter

T22B

General information
- Type: Helicopter
- National origin: Italy
- Manufacturer: Italian Rotors Industries
- Status: Production completed (2016)

History
- Variant: IRI T250A

The IRI T22B is an Italian helicopter that was designed and produced by Italian Rotors Industries of Aprilia, Lazio. Now out of production, when it was available the aircraft was supplied complete and ready-to-fly.

The company seems to have been founded about 2013 and gone out of business in June 2016, ending production.

== Design and development ==
The T22B features a single main rotor and tail rotor, a two-seats-in side-by-side configuration enclosed cockpit with a windshield, skid landing gear and a four-cylinder, air-cooled, four stroke 160 hp (119 kW) Lycoming O-320-B2C aircraft engine.

The aircraft fuselage is made from composites. Its two-bladed rotor has a diameter of 7.6 m (24.9 ft). The aircraft has a typical empty weight of 355 kg (783 lb) and a gross weight of 650 kg (1,433 lb), giving a useful load of 295 kg (650 lb). With full fuel of 70 litres (15 imp gal; 18 US gal), the payload for the crew, passenger and baggage is 244 kg (538 lb).

In 2015, reviewer Werner Pfaendler described the T22B's design as "elegant".

== Variants ==
T22B
Version with 160 hp (119 kW) Lycoming O-320-B2C powerplant.
T23B
Version with 180 hp (134 kW) Lycoming O-360-A2J powerplant.

== Specifications (T22B) ==
Data from Tacke

General characteristics

- Crew: one
- Capacity: one passenger
- Empty weight: 355 kg (783 lb)
- Gross weight: 650 kg (1,433 lb)
- Fuel capacity: 70 litres (15 imp gal; 18 US gal)
- Powerplant: 1 × Lycoming O-320-B2C four cylinder, air-cooled, four stroke aircraft engine, 120 kW (160 hp)
- Main rotor diameter: 7.6 m (24 ft 11 in)
- Main rotor area: 45 m^{2} (480 sq ft)

Performance

- Maximum speed: 195 km/h (121 mph, 105 kn)
- Cruise speed: 165 km/h (103 mph, 89 kn)
- Rate of climb: 5 m/s (980 ft/min)
- Disk loading: 14.4 kg/m^{2} (2.9 lb/sq ft)

== See also ==
- List of rotorcraft
