= Airmaster H2-B1 =

H2-B1

General information
- Type: Two-seat ultralight helicopter
- National origin: United Kingdom
- Manufacturer: Airmaster Helicopters
- Number built: 1

History
- First flight: 12 September 1972

The Airmaster H2-B1 is a British two-seat ultralight helicopter built by Airmaster Helicopters of Camberley, Surrey.

== Development ==
The H2-B1 was designed with the co-operation of the builders of the American Helicom helicopter. Construction of the prototype, registered G-AYNS, was started in September 1970 and it was first flown from Redhill Aerodrome on 12 September 1972. It was intended that an improved H2-B2 variant would enter production but only the prototype H2-B1 was built.

== Design ==
The H2-B1 is a two-seat ultralight helicopter with a single two-bladed main rotor and a two-bladed tail rotor. The fuselage is a welded tubular structure skinned with aluminium and had two side-by-side configuration seats for the pilot and a passenger, it is also fitted with a skid landing gear, small wheels are fitted to allow the helicopter to be moved on the ground. The engine is a 100 hp (75 kW) Rolls-Royce Continental O-200-A air-cooled engine driving the main and tail rotors through a simple gearbox.

== Variants ==
H2-B1
Prototype, one built
H2-B2
Proposed production variant with streamlined fuselage and a monocoque tailboom, not built.

== Specifications ==
Data from Jane's All the World's Aircraft 1973-74

General characteristics

- Crew: 2
- Length: 7.70 m (25 ft 3 in)
- Height: 2.46 m (8 ft 1 in)
- Empty weight: 334 kg (738 lb)
- Gross weight: 544 kg (1,200 lb)
- Powerplant: 1 × Rolls-Royce Continental O-200-A four-cylinder, horizontally-opposed, air-cooled piston , 67 kW (100 hp)
- Main rotor diameter: 7.01 m (23 ft 0 in)
- Main rotor area: 104.0 m^{2} (1,120 sq ft)

Performance

- Maximum speed: 153 km/h (99.5 mph, 86.5 kn)
- Cruise speed: 137 km/h (85 mph, 74 kn)
- Range: 370 km (230 mi, 200 nmi)
- Service ceiling: 3,050 m (10,000 ft)
- Rate of climb: 9.1 m/s (1,800 ft/min)

== See also ==
Related lists

- List of rotorcraft
