= Konner K1 =

Italian helicopter

K1-S19
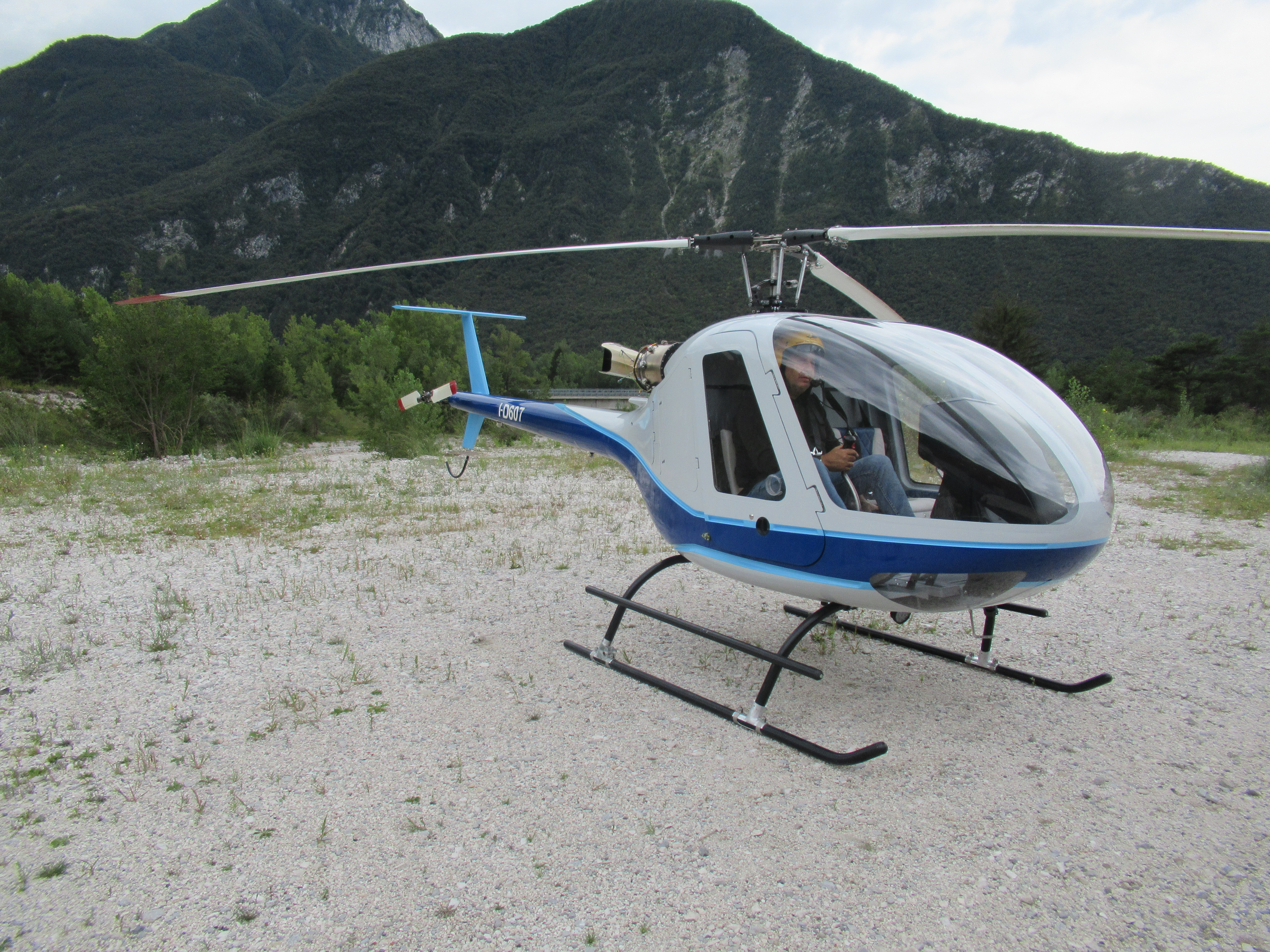

General information
- Type: Helicopter
- National origin: Italy
- Manufacturer: Konner Srl
- Status: In production (2018)

The Konner K1 is an Italian helicopter designed and produced by Konner Srl of Amaro, Friuli. The aircraft is supplied complete and ready-to-fly.

== Design and development ==
The K1-S19 was designed to comply with the European Class 6 microlight helicopter rules and it's certified as ultralight helicopter MTOW 600Kg. It features a single main rotor and tail rotor, a two-seats-in side-by-side configuration enclosed cockpit with a windshield, skid landing gear and a 250 hp (186 kW) Konner TK-250 turboshaft engine.

The aircraft fuselage is made from carbon fibre. Its three-bladed rotor has a diameter of 8.65 m (28.4 ft). The aircraft has a typical empty weight of 350 kg (772 lb) and a gross weight of 450 kg (992 lb), giving a useful load of 200 kg (441 lb). With full fuel of 150 litres (33 imp gal; 40 US gal) the payload for the pilot, passengers and baggage is 250 kg (551 lb).

The Konner TK-250 turboshaft engine includes full FADEC control that uses only three positions: stop, idle and flight. The powerplant weighs 50 kg (110 lb) and will burn JP-1, JP-4, diesel fuel or biodiesel.

The design has an electrical power system to aid autorotation in the event of main engine loss in flight which is called H.A.S.- Hybrid Assistant System, which is able to supply extra 90 hp to the main transmission in case of loss of power.

== Specifications (K1-S19) ==
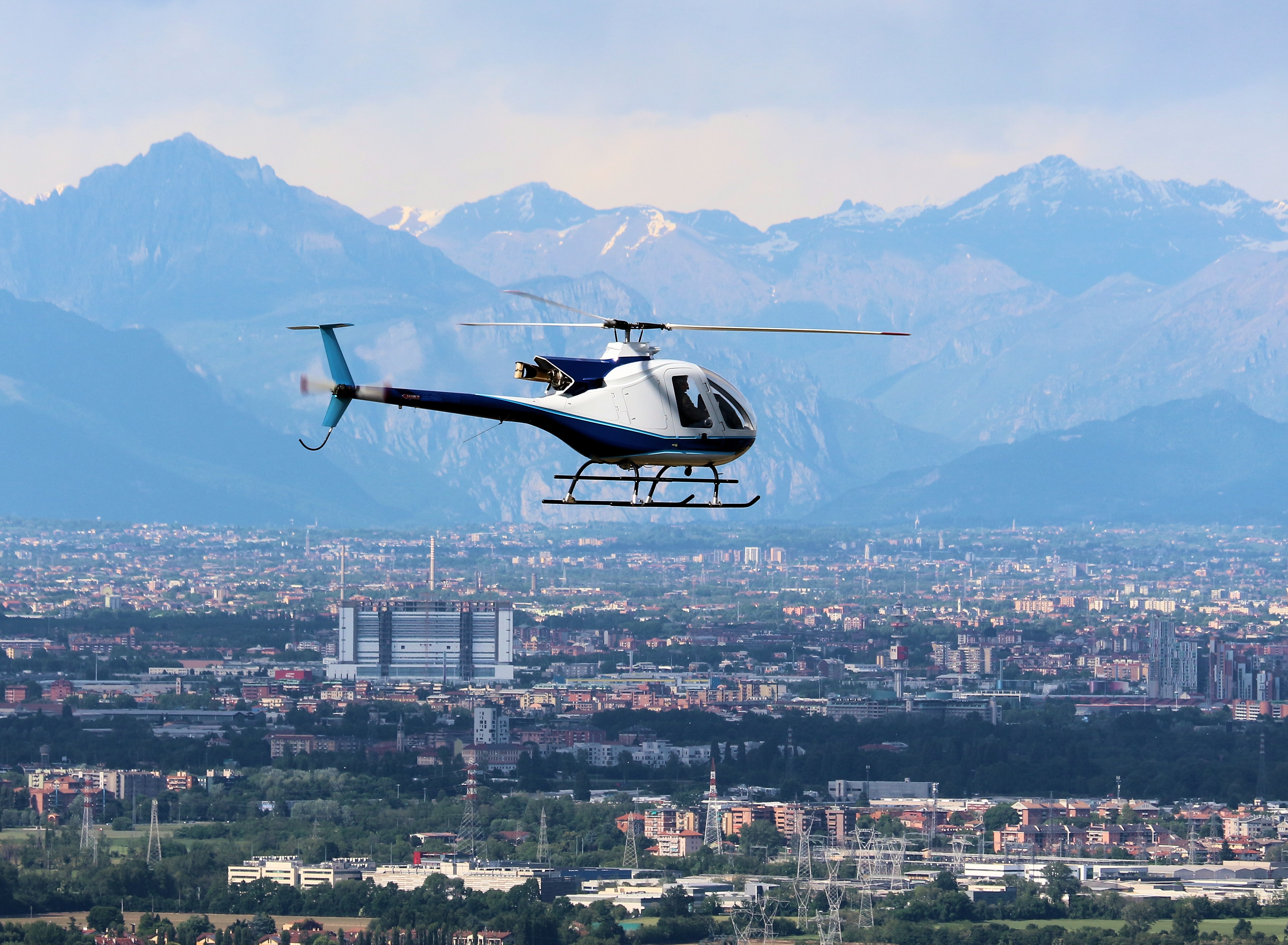
Konner K1

Data from Tacke and manufacturer

General characteristics

- Crew: two
- Capacity: one pilot, one passenger
- Length: 8.65 m (28 ft 5 in)
- Width: 1.65 m (5 ft 5 in)
- Height: 2.35 m (7 ft 9 in)
- Empty weight: 350 kg (772 lb)
- Gross weight: 450 kg (992 lb)
- Fuel capacity: 140 litres (31 imp gal; 37 US gal)
- Powerplant: 1 × Konner TK-250 turboshaft engine, 190 kW (250 hp)
- Main rotor diameter: 6.80 m (22 ft 4 in)
- Main rotor area: 36 m^{2} (390 sq ft)

Performance

- Maximum speed: 215 km/h (134 mph, 120 kn)
- Cruise speed: 213 km/h (132 mph, 115 kn)
- Never exceed speed: 220 km/h (140 mph, 120 kn)
- Range: 592 km (368 mi, 320 nmi)
- Service ceiling: 4,600 m (15,000 ft)
- Rate of climb: 13 m/s (2,600 ft/min)
- Disk loading: 12.5 kg/m^{2} (2.6 lb/sq ft)

== See also ==
- List of rotorcraft
