= Calumet Snobird Explorer =

American autogyro

Snobird Explorer

General information
- Type: Autogyro
- National origin: United States
- Manufacturer: Calumet Motorsports
- Status: Production completed
- Number built: at least 1 of all manufacture

History
- First flight: May 1997

The Calumet Snobird Explorer was an American autogyro designed and produced by Calumet Motorsports of Lansing, Illinois, introduced in May 1997. Now out of production, when it was available, the aircraft was supplied as a kit for amateur construction.

== Design and development ==
Calumet Aeronautics, owned and operated by Tommy Milton, designed an entry level Ultralight gyroplane. Calumet Aeronautics then purchased the assets of the SnoBird Aircraft Company. After moving the assets from Bristol, TN. to Lansing, IL. Tommy Milton and partner, George Smundin inventoried the SnoBird assets and decided to put the entire Snobird line back in production after evaluating the design integrity and high quality of the manuals. Tommy and George decided to put the Snobird line back into production. The company name was changed to Calumet Motorsports due to the difficulty of purchasing bearings and other critical components. The gyroplane business grew and an additional partner was taken on who, eventually bought out Tommy and George. The new owner later sold the business. The new owner sold parts of the business back to Calumet Motorsports. The new owner resold the business once again and the design remains out of production.

The Snobird Explorer was designed as a low-cost, entry-level autogyro, to comply with the US FAR 103 Ultralight Vehicles, including the category's maximum empty weight of 254 lb (115 kg). The aircraft has a standard empty weight of 244 lb (111 kg). It features a single main rotor, a single-seat open cockpit, tricycle landing gear and a twin-cylinder, air-cooled, two-stroke, single-ignition 40 hp (30 kW) Rotax 447 engine in pusher configuration.

The aircraft fuselage is made from a combination of composite material and aluminum and features a tall tail design to reduce engine-induced yaw. The kit was supplied with jig pre-drilled holes and was powder coated. Its two-bladed rotor has a diameter of 23.0 ft (7.0 m). Full fuel is 5 U.S. gallons (19 L; 4.2 imp gal).

The standard day, sea level, no wind takeoff with a 40 hp (30 kW) engine is 100 ft (30 m) and the landing roll is 20 ft (6 m).

== Operational history ==
By 1998 the company reported that one aircraft had been completed and was flying, with customer deliveries to commence later in 1998.

In April 2015 six examples of Snobird autogyros of all manufacture were registered in the United States with the Federal Aviation Administration, although a total of 14 had been registered at one time.

== Specifications (Snobird Explorer) ==
Data from Purdy

General characteristics

- Crew: one
- Empty weight: 244 lb (111 kg)
- Fuel capacity: 5 U.S. gallons (19 L; 4.2 imp gal)
- Powerplant: 1 × Rotax 447 twin cylinder, air-cooled, two stroke aircraft engine, 40 hp (30 kW)
- Main rotor diameter: 23 ft 0 in (7.01 m)
- Main rotor area: 415 sq ft (38.6 m^{2})
- Propellers: 2-bladed wooden, fixed pitch

Performance

- Cruise speed: 60 mph (97 km/h, 52 kn)
- Rate of climb: 700 ft/min (3.6 m/s)

== See also ==
- List of rotorcraft
