= Star Aviation LoneStar Sport Helicopter =

American helicopter

LoneStar Sport Helicopter

General information
- Type: Single-seat very light helicopter
- National origin: United States
- Manufacturer: Star Aviation

History
- Introduction date: 1991
- First flight: 1990
- Developed into: Redback Buzzard

The Star Aviation LoneStar Sport Helicopter is an American very light helicopter designed by Star Aviation Inc of New Braunsfels, Texas, for amateur construction.

The LoneStar was developed by Ken Rehler and Tom Carlson as a simple single-seat very light helicopter. Rehler formed Star Aviation to market the design in kit-form. The open-frame helicopter was powered by a 65 hp (48 kW) Rotax 582 piston engine.

Due to the death of Rehler, Star Aviation no longer produces and sells kits. The aircraft was later developed into the Redback Buzzard, but only one prototype was completed.

== Specifications ==
Data from Taylor

General characteristics

- Crew: 1
- Length: 13 ft 11 in (4.24 m)
- Height: 7 ft 3 in (2.21 m)
- Empty weight: 420 lb (191 kg)
- Powerplant: 1 × Rotax 582 piston engine, 64 hp (48 kW)
- Main rotor diameter: 21 ft 5 in (6.53 m)

Performance

- Maximum speed: 90 mph (145 km/h, 78 kn)
- Cruise speed: 65 mph (105 km/h, 57 kn)
- Rate of climb: 600 ft/min (3.0 m/s)

== See also ==
Related lists

- List of rotorcraft
