= Craft Aerotech 200 =

General information
- Type: Autogyro
- National origin: United States
- Manufacturer: Craft Aerotech
- Designer: Jack Craft

History
- First flight: 1990s

The Craft Aerotech 200 is an American two-seat autogyro that was designed by Jack Craft and produced by Craft Aerotech of Missoula, Montana, United States. The autogyro was supplied as a kit for amateur construction and was also available as a plan.

== Design and development ==
The Craft Aerotech 200 has a metal tube frame and a composite structure with two enclosed side by side seats. It has a single two-bladed rotor and is powered by two 52 hp (39 kW) Rotax 503 engines, mounted side-by-side in a pusher configuration. It has a fixed tricycle landing gear.

== Specifications ==
Data from Brassey's World Aircraft & Systems Directory 1996

General characteristics

- Crew: 1
- Capacity: 1
- Length: 15 ft 0 in (4.57 m)
- Height: 8 ft 6 in (2.59 m)
- Empty weight: 650 lb (295 kg)
- Max takeoff weight: 454 lb (206 kg)
- Powerplant: 2 × Rotax 503 , 52 hp (39 kW) each
- Main rotor diameter: 27 ft 4 in (8.33 m)

Performance

- Maximum speed: 100 mph (161 km/h, 87 kn)
- Cruise speed: 90 mph (144 km/h, 78 kn)
- Range: 250 mi (400 km, 220 nmi)
- Service ceiling: 12,000 ft (3,700 m)

== See also ==
Related lists

- List of rotorcraft
