= Pawnee Warrior =

American Light experimental helicopter

Warrior
- The Pawnee Warrior prototype in flight

General information
- Type: Helicopter
- National origin: United States
- Manufacturer: Pawnee Aviation
- Status: Production completed
- Number built: Probably just one prototype

History
- Variant: Pawnee Chief

The Pawnee Warrior was an American helicopter that was designed and produced by Pawnee Aviation of Longmont, Colorado. Now out of production, when it was available the aircraft was supplied as a kit for amateur construction.

== Design and development ==
The Warrior was designed to comply with the US Experimental - Amateur-built aircraft rules. It featured a single 21 ft (6.4 m) diameter two-bladed main rotor, a two-bladed tail rotor, both made from single metal extrusions. The kit's drive components were intended to be supplied complete and ready to install. The aircraft had a single-seat open cockpit without a windshield and skid-type landing gear. A cockpit enclosure was optional. The standard engine used was a twin cylinder, air-cooled, two-stroke, dual-ignition 65 hp (48 kW) Hirth 2706 powerplant.

The aircraft fuselage was made from steel and aluminum tubing and supplied in three major bolt-together sub-assemblies. It had an empty weight of 437 lb (198 kg) and a gross weight of 850 lb (386 kg), giving a useful load of 413 lb (187 kg). With full fuel of 14 U.S. gallons (53 L; 12 imp gal) the payload for the pilot and baggage was 329 lb (149 kg).

The manufacturer estimated the construction time from the planned assembly kit as 80 hours.

The company said "the Warrior was used [as] a proof of concept platform to develop new models" and was followed by the two place Pawnee Chief.

== Operational history ==
By 1998 the company reported that one aircraft had been completed and was flying.

By April 2015 no examples were registered in the United States with the Federal Aviation Administration.

== Specifications (Warrior) ==
Data from Purdy

General characteristics

- Crew: one
- Length: 15 ft 0 in (4.57 m)
- Empty weight: 437 lb (198 kg)
- Gross weight: 850 lb (386 kg)
- Fuel capacity: 14 U.S. gallons (53 L; 12 imp gal)
- Powerplant: 1 × Hirth 2706 twin cylinder, air-cooled, two stroke aircraft engine, 65 hp (48 kW)
- Main rotor diameter: 21 ft 0 in (6.40 m)
- Main rotor area: 346 sq ft (32.1 m^{2})

Performance

- Maximum speed: 100 mph (160 km/h, 87 kn)
- Cruise speed: 80 mph (130 km/h, 70 kn)
- Range: 180 mi (290 km, 160 nmi)
- Service ceiling: 10,000 ft (3,000 m)
- Disk loading: 2.5 lb/sq ft (12 kg/m^{2})

== See also ==
- List of rotorcraft
