= Aviomania G1SA Genesis Solo =

Gyrocopter

G1SA Genesis Solo

General information
- Type: Autogyro
- National origin: Cyprus
- Manufacturer: Aviomania
- Designer: Nicolas Karaolides
- Status: Production completed

History
- Variant: Aviomania G2SA Genesis Duo

The Aviomania G1SA Genesis Solo is a Cypriot autogyro that was designed by Nicolas Karaolides and produced by Aviomania of Larnaca. Now out of production, when it was available the aircraft was supplied as a complete ready-to-fly-aircraft or as a kit for amateur construction.

== Design and development ==
The G1SA Genesis Solo features a single main rotor, a single-seat open cockpit with a windshield, tricycle landing gear with wheel pants, plus a tail caster and a twin cylinder, liquid-cooled, two-stroke, dual-ignition 64 hp (48 kW) Rotax 582 engine in pusher configuration. Other engine options included the 80 hp (60 kW) Rotax 912 UL.

The aircraft fuselage is made from bolted-together aluminum tubing and is equipped with a composite fairing. Its two-bladed rotor has a diameter of 7.0 m (23.0 ft) and a chord of .18 m (7.1 in). The aircraft has a typical empty weight of 140 kg (309 lb) and a gross weight of 300 kg (661 lb), giving a useful load of 160 kg (353 lb). With full fuel of 26 litres (5.7 imp gal; 6.9 US gal) the payload for the pilot and baggage is 142 kg (313 lb).

== Operational history ==
In a 2015 review, Werner Pfaendler wrote, "The Genesis G1sa Solo has been designed with stability and agility in mind. The centre line thrust and the design of the empennage in the propeller slipstream reduces all throttle reactions. The result is a fun machine which is very stable in flight while being very agile and maneuverable."

== Specifications (G1SA Genesis Solo) ==
Data from Tacke

General characteristics

- Crew: one
- Empty weight: 140 kg (309 lb)
- Gross weight: 300 kg (661 lb)
- Fuel capacity: 26 litres (5.7 imp gal; 6.9 US gal)
- Powerplant: 1 × Rotax 582 two-cylinder, liquid-cooled, two stroke aircraft engine, 48 kW (64 hp)
- Main rotor diameter: 7.0 m (23 ft 0 in)
- Main rotor area: 38 m^{2} (410 sq ft)
- Propellers: 3-bladed ground adjustable

Performance

- Maximum speed: 130 km/h (81 mph, 70 kn)
- Cruise speed: 120 km/h (75 mph, 65 kn)
- Rate of climb: 7 m/s (1,400 ft/min)
- Disk loading: 7.9 kg/m^{2} (1.6 lb/sq ft)

== See also ==
- List of rotorcraft
