= Arrow Coax Livella Uno =

German helicopter

Livella Uno

General information
- Type: Helicopter
- National origin: Germany
- Manufacturer: Arrow Coax Ultra Light Helicopter
- Status: Under development (2015)
- Number built: at least one

History
- Introduction date: 2015

The Arrow Coax Livella Uno (transl. First Level) is a German helicopter under development by Arrow Coax Ultra Light Helicopter of Hornhausen and introduced at the AERO Friedrichshafen airshow in 2015. The aircraft is intended to be supplied as a kit for amateur construction.

== Design and development ==
The Livella Uno was designed to comply with the US FAR 103 Ultralight Vehicles and the European 120 kg class ultralight aircraft rules. It features a dual coaxial main rotors, with an inverted V-tail, a single open-air pilot's seat without a windshield, tricycle landing gear and a 40 hp (30 kW) Wankel Aixro XH40 engine.

The aircraft fuselage is made from tubing. Its two-bladed rotors have a diameter of 3.8 m (12.5 ft). The aircraft has a typical empty weight of 85 kg (187 lb) and a gross weight of 195 kg (430 lb), giving a useful load of 110 kg (243 lb).

The aircraft mounts a Galaxy Rescue System ballistic parachute in the rotor mast. It also has a small electric motor to power the rotor system from a battery in the event of an engine failure, allowing five minutes of power to land, since the low inertia rotor blades may not support autorotation.

== Specifications (Livella Uno) ==
Data from Tacke

General characteristics

- Crew: one
- Empty weight: 85 kg (187 lb)
- Gross weight: 195 kg (430 lb)
- Powerplant: 1 × Aixro XH40 liquid-cooled, Wankel aircraft engine, 30 kW (40 hp)
- Main rotor diameter: 2 × 3.8 m (12 ft 6 in)
- Main rotor area: 23 m^{2} (250 sq ft)

Performance

- Maximum speed: 110 km/h (68 mph, 59 kn)
- Cruise speed: 90 km/h (56 mph, 49 kn)
- Disk loading: 8.5 kg/m^{2} (1.7 lb/sq ft)

== See also ==
- List of rotorcraft
