= Hungaro Copter =

Hungarian helicopter

Hungarocopter HC-01
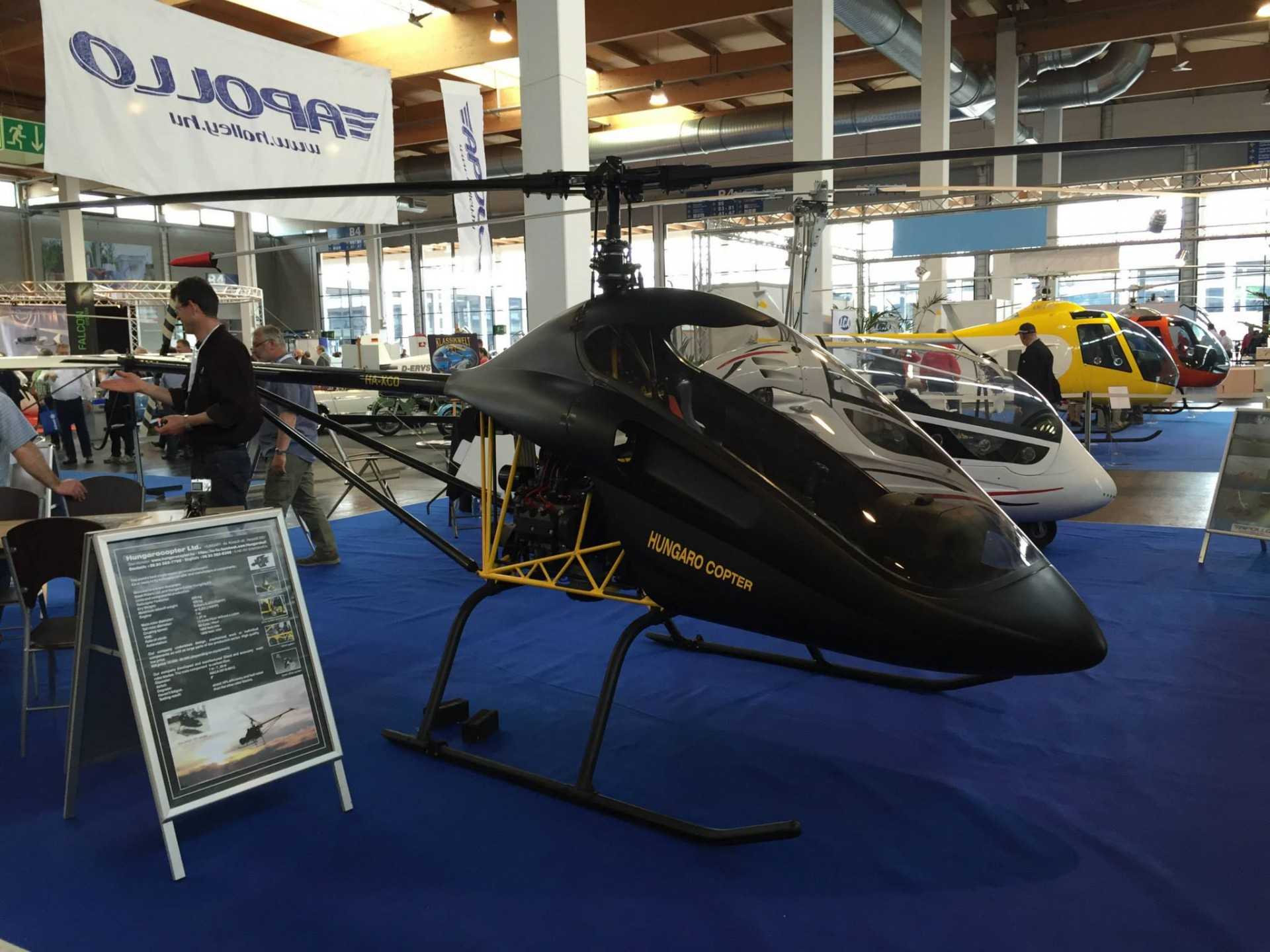

General information
- Type: Helicopter
- National origin: Hungary
- Manufacturer: Hungaro Copter Limited

The Hungaro Copter is a Hungarian helicopter produced by Hungaro Copter Limited of Verpelét, an affiliate of the Steel Riders Limited company. The lead engineer for the design was Farkas Gábor. The aircraft is supplied as a kit for amateur construction.

== Design and development ==
The aircraft was designed to comply with the European microlight aircraft rules. It features a single main rotor and tail rotor, a single-seat enclosed cockpit with a fairing, or an open cockpit without a windshield, skid landing gear and a four-cylinder, four stroke 135 hp (101 kW) Subaru EJ22 or 160 hp (119 kW) Subaru EJ25 automotive conversion engine. The six-cylinder 125 hp (93 kW) D-Motor LF39 powerplant has also been used.

The aircraft fuselage is made from welded steel tubing. Its two-bladed rotor has a diameter of 7.0 m (23.0 ft). The aircraft has a typical empty weight of 300 kg (661 lb) and a gross weight of 430 kg (948 lb), giving a useful load of 130 kg (287 lb).

The construction time from the supplied kit is estimated as 300 hours.

== Specifications (Hungaro Copter) ==
Data from Tacke

General characteristics

- Crew: one
- Empty weight: 300 kg (661 lb)
- Gross weight: 430 kg (948 lb)
- Powerplant: 1 × Subaru EJ22 four cylinder, liquid-cooled, four stroke automotive conversion engine, 101 kW (135 hp)
- Main rotor diameter: 7.0 m (23 ft 0 in)
- Main rotor area: 38 m^{2} (410 sq ft)

Performance

- Cruise speed: 130 km/h (81 mph, 70 kn)
- Rate of climb: 6.5 m/s (1,280 ft/min)
- Disk loading: 11.3 kg/m^{2} (2.3 lb/sq ft)

== See also ==
- List of rotorcraft
