= GEN 125 =

Japanese aircraft engine

- Type: Aircraft engine
- National origin: Japan
- Manufacturer: GEN Corporation
- Major applications: GEN H-4

The GEN 125 is a Japanese aircraft engine, designed and produced by the GEN Corporation for use in ultralight helicopters.

== Design and development ==
The engine is a twin cylinder two-stroke, horizontally-opposed, air-cooled, 124 cc (7.6 cu in), direct-drive, gasoline engine design. It employs capacitor discharge ignition and produces 8 hp (6 kW) at 8500 rpm. The engine weighs 3 kg (6.6 lb).

The engine was designed specifically for the GEN H-4 helicopter, in which four of the engines are mounted to provide redundancy.

== Variants ==
GEN 125
Base model producing 8 hp (6 kW)
GEN 125-F
Model producing 10 hp (7 kW)

== Applications ==
- GEN H-4

== Specifications (GEN 125) ==
Data from World Directory of Leisure Aviation 2011-12

=== General characteristics ===
- Type: Twin cylinder, two stroke aircraft engine
- Displacement: 124 cc (7.6 cu in)
- Dry weight: 3 kg (6.6 lb)

=== Components ===
- Fuel type: gasoline
- Cooling system: liquid or air

=== Performance ===
- Power output: 8 hp (6 kW) at 8500 rpm

== See also ==
Related lists

- List of aircraft engines
