= Freewind Bumble B =

French gyroplane

Bumble B

General information
- Type: Autogyro
- National origin: France
- Manufacturer: Freewind Aviation
- Status: Production completed (2014)

The Freewind Bumble B (transl. Bumblebee) is a French autogyro that was designed and produced by Freewind Aviation of Vimory, introduced in about 2013. Now out of production, when it was available the aircraft was supplied complete and ready-to-fly.

Freewind Aviation seems to have been founded about 2013 and gone out of business in 2014. It is not clear how many aircraft were produced, although at least one example flew.

== Design and development ==
The Bumble B features a single main rotor, a two-seats-in tandem open cockpit with composite fairing and a windshield, tricycle landing gear and a modified four-cylinder, liquid and air-cooled, four stroke, turbocharged 122 hp (91 kW) Rotax 912 engine in pusher configuration.

The aircraft has a two-bladed rotor with a diameter of 8.4 m (27.6 ft) and a chord of 21.5 cm (8.5 in). The aircraft has a typical empty weight of 258 kg (569 lb) and a gross weight of 450 kg (992 lb), giving a useful load of 192 kg (423 lb). With full fuel of 75 litres (16 imp gal; 20 US gal) the payload for the pilot, passenger and baggage is 138 kg (304 lb).

Reviewer Werner Pfaendler described the design as, "a low cost but good quality gyrocopter with excellent flight characteristics".

== Specifications (Bumble B 912 Supercharged) ==
Data from Tacke

General characteristics

- Crew: one
- Capacity: one passenger
- Empty weight: 258 kg (569 lb)
- Gross weight: 450 kg (992 lb)
- Fuel capacity: 75 litres (16 imp gal; 20 US gal)
- Powerplant: 1 × modified Rotax 912ULS four cylinder, liquid and air-cooled, four stroke, turbocharged aircraft engine, 91 kW (122 hp)
- Main rotor diameter: 8.4 m (27 ft 7 in)
- Main rotor area: 57 m^{2} (610 sq ft)
- Propellers: 3-bladed composite

Performance

- Maximum speed: 200 km/h (120 mph, 110 kn)
- Cruise speed: 150 km/h (93 mph, 81 kn)
- Rate of climb: 3.1 m/s (610 ft/min)
- Disk loading: 7.9 kg/m^{2} (1.6 lb/sq ft)

== See also ==
- List of rotorcraft
