= SKT Skyrider 06 =

Swiss helicopter

Skyrider 06

General information
- Type: Helicopter
- National origin: Switzerland
- Manufacturer: SKT Swiss Kopter Technology SA
- Status: In production (2018)

History
- Manufactured: January 2014 - present
- First flight: 2013

The SKT Skyrider 06 is a Swiss helicopter, designed and produced by SKT Swiss Kopter Technology SA of Ambrì. It was first flown in 2013 and entered series production in January 2014. The aircraft is supplied complete and ready-to-fly.

== Design and development ==
The Skyrider development was started in December 2011. In June 2013 the company was formed to produce the aircraft and the first production examples were completed in January 2014.

The design features a single main rotor and tail rotor, a two-seats-in side-by-side configuration enclosed cockpit with a windshield, skid landing gear and a four-cylinder, liquid-cooled, four stroke 155 hp (116 kW) Italian MW Fly B22 AeroPower piston engine.

The aircraft fuselage is made from steel tubing, with a carbon fibre composite cockpit and tailboom. The aircraft's composite three-bladed main rotor has a diameter of 7.0 m (23.0 ft). The composite tail rotor has two blades and a diameter of 1.4 m (4.6 ft). The cabin width is 130 cm (51.2 in). The aircraft has a gross weight of 600 kg (1,323 lb). With full fuel of 110 litres (24 imp gal; 29 US gal) the payload for the pilot, passengers and baggage is 230 kg (507 lb).

Reviewer Werner Pfaendler, describes it as an "elegant design".

== Operational history ==
By January 2018 one example had been registered in Canada with Transport Canada under the Special Certificate of Airworthiness Limited category.

== Specifications (Skyrider) ==
Data from Tacke and manufacturer

General characteristics

- Crew: one
- Capacity: one passenger
- Length: 2.00 m (6.57 ft)
- Height: 2.28 m (7 ft 6 in)
- Gross weight: 600 kg (1,323 lb)
- Fuel capacity: 110 litres (24 imp gal; 29 US gal)
- Powerplant: 1 × MW Fly B22 AeroPower four cylinder, liquid-cooled, four stroke aircraft engine, 116 kW (155 hp)
- Main rotor diameter: 7.0 m (23 ft 0 in)
- Main rotor area: 38 m^{2} (410 sq ft)

Performance

- Maximum speed: 200 km/h (120 mph, 110 kn)
- Cruise speed: 157 km/h (98 mph, 85 kn)
- Never exceed speed: 200 km/h (124 mph, 108 kn)
- Endurance: 5 hours and 10 minutes
- Service ceiling: 3,000 m (10,000 ft)
- Rate of climb: 7.5 m/s (1,480 ft/min)
- Disk loading: 15.7 kg/m^{2} (3.2 lb/sq ft)

== See also ==
- List of rotorcraft
