= Koden =

Koden may refer to:

- Kodeń, a village in Poland
  - Gmina Kodeń, the administrative district
- Koden Khan, a successor of Genghis Khan
- Koden, a Japanese company founded by Yoji Ito

== See also ==
- Coden (disambiguation)
