= German Gyro Matto =

German autogyro

Matto

General information
- Type: Autogyro
- National origin: Germany
- Manufacturer: German Gyro Safety Aviation GmbH
- Status: In production (2017)

History
- Introduction date: 2013

The German Gyro Matto is a German autogyro, designed and produced by German Gyro Safety Aviation GmbH of Menden, introduced at the AERO Friedrichshafen airshow in 2013. The aircraft is supplied complete and ready-to-fly.

== Design and development ==
The Matto features a single main rotor, a two-seats-in side-by-side configuration enclosed cockpit with a windshield, tricycle landing gear with wheel pants and a 130 hp (97 kW) GG 912 VT engine in pusher configuration.

The aircraft fuselage is made from a combination of carbon fibre and Kevlar. Its two-bladed rotor has a diameter of 8.52 m (28.0 ft) and a chord of 21.5 cm (8.5 in). The aircraft has a typical empty weight of 296 kg (653 lb) and a gross weight of 560 kg (1,235 lb), giving a useful load of 264 kg (582 lb). With full fuel of 130 litres (29 imp gal; 34 US gal) the payload for the pilot, passenger and baggage is 171 kg (377 lb).

The design incorporates a number of safety features, including a ballistic parachute mounted inside the rotor mast, which ensures that the rotor will not contact the parachute as it is deployed. Other safety features include a fire-proof cockpit, rupture-resistant and fuel tanks and anti-collision strobe lights.

== Specifications (Matto) ==
Data from Tacke

General characteristics

- Crew: one
- Capacity: one passenger
- Empty weight: 296 kg (653 lb)
- Gross weight: 560 kg (1,235 lb)
- Fuel capacity: 130 litres (29 imp gal; 34 US gal)
- Powerplant: 1 × GG 912 VT aircraft engine, 97 kW (130 hp)
- Main rotor diameter: 8.52 m (27 ft 11 in)
- Main rotor area: 57 m^{2} (610 sq ft)
- Propellers: 3-bladed composite

Performance

- Disk loading: 9.8 kg/m^{2} (2.0 lb/sq ft)

== See also ==
- List of rotorcraft
