= Federico Cantero Villamil =

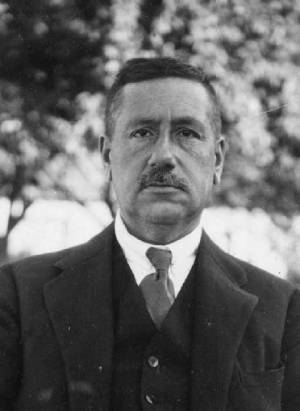
Federico Cantero Villamil, 1920

Federico Cantero Villamil (Madrid, 22 June 1874 - 1946) was a Spanish civil engineer known for the dams he constructed and planned along the river Duero and for his research on the aeronautical field, which is summarized in the Libélula española, a helicopter constructed by him.

== Early work ==
His parents were the civil engineer Federico Cantero Seirullo and Isabel Villamil Olivares. He married Tránsito Cid, and they had two children. A few years later she died. Later, Cantero married Concepción García-Arenal Winter, a granddaughter of Concepción Arenal, and they had six children.

He became an engineer 30 September 1896, with the first mark. He did his working practice during 1897 in Zamora, and in 1900 he began to work at the "Jefatura de Obras Públicas de Zamora". In May 1900 he asked and obtained a leave in order to work in hydraulics. At that moment, the governments of Spain and Portugal were planning how to exploit the hydroelectric potential of the river Duero.

== The dams ==
In 1899 founds the society "El porvenir de Zamora" (The Prospect of Zamora), with the aim of funding and exploiting the dam of San Roman, near Zamora. Its construction lasted until 1903. This dam took profit of a "hoz" (meander) of river Duero that was 11.2 km. long. He opened a tunnel 1.5 km. long and built up the turbines and engines at the other side. By means of this, the unevenness from the reservoir to the turbines measured 14 meters, while the height of the dam was only 5 meters.

He also designed and projected the so-called "Solución española de los Saltos del Duero", a project that planned all the dams in the Spanish side of river Duero.

Finally, he projected the actual construction of some of these dams, and also other dams at Burgomillodo, river Duratón and river Eresma.

He patented in 1945 a "new type of hydraulic lockgate actioned by the very water of the canal or dam where they are installed".

== Railway ==
In 1913 proposed a project joining Zamora and Ourense through Puebla de Sanabria by railway. It was one of the hardest engineer works of its time: the project had more than 100 tunnels, in particular the Padornelo tunnel, 6 km. long. It was executed between 1921 and 1957 with a single track, although the design supported double track.

== Aeronautics ==
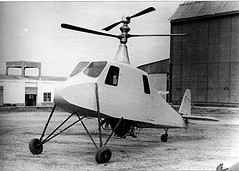
Libélula española developed by the Spanish civil engineer Federico Cantero Villamil.

Although Cantero's main work was that of the dams, since 1908 he was patenting other inventions in the field of aeronautics. His main interest was the problem of flight. It is in 1910 when he patented an ...idea to hold bodies in the air, and, if wanted, propulsion. Thirty-four patents followed the first one, being the last ones devoted to the helicopter he constructed: the Libélula española. Using the knowledge he acquired during thirty years of work, Cantero started to build up this helicopter in 1936, competing with Igor Sikorsky for flying a helicopter. The Spanish Civil War began that year, and the helicopter stayed in Madrid (republican zone) while Cantero remained in Zamora (national zone). In October 1941 the helicopter was ready for test. The results of this test were lost, and the project of flying was decaying as Sigorsky tested his helicopter fruitfully in 1938.

== Sources ==
The works of Cantero were forgotten during years, and they have been recently rediscovered by Isabel Díaz de Aguilar and Federico Suárez Caballero. Basic primary sources are the patents he registered and two books by Cantero about the Libélula española.
