= István Gazda =

Hungarian philatelist

- Born: 22 November 1927
- Died: 2006 (aged 78–79)
- Occupation: Philatelist

István Gazda (22 November 1927 - 2006) was a Hungarian philatelist who was added to the Roll of Distinguished Philatelists in 1993.

Gazda is the co-author and co-editor of the Hungarian Philatelic Encyclopedia, Director of the Hungarian Philatelic Association, and the Special Representative in Hungary of the Royal Philatelic Society London.
