= Italian Rotors Industries =

Italian aircraft manufacturer

Italian Rotors Industries Srl
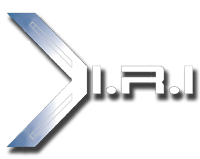
- Company type: Società a responsabilità limitata
- Industry: Aerospace
- Founded: 2013
- Defunct: June 2016
- Headquarters: Aprilia, Lazio, Italy
- Products: Helicopters

Italian Rotors Industries Srl (IRI) was an Italian aircraft manufacturer based in Aprilia, Lazio. The company specialized in the design and manufacture of helicopters in the form ready-to-fly aircraft.

The firm was a società a responsabilità limitata, an Italian limited liability company.

The company seems to have been founded about 2013 and went out of business in June 2016.

The organization produced three helicopter models, all based upon the same general design. The IRI T22B is powered by an American-made four-cylinder, air-cooled, four stroke 160 hp (119 kW) Lycoming O-320-B2C aircraft engine. The IRI T23B employs the 180 hp (134 kW) Lycoming O-360-A2J powerplant. The IRI T250A is powered by a 250 hp (186 kW) PBS TS 100 turboshaft engine made by PBS Velká Bíteš of the Czech Republic.

Reviewer Werner Pfaendler, described the company's helicopter designs as "elegant".

== Aircraft ==
Summary of aircraft built by IRI:

- IRI T22B
- IRI T23B
- IRI T250A
