= Rotorwing-Aero =

American aircraft design firm

- Company type: Privately held company
- Industry: Aerospace
- Founded: 1980s
- Founder: Monte Hoskins
- Defunct: after 1998
- Fate: Out of business
- Headquarters: United States
- Products: Gyroplanes

Rotorwing-Aero was an American aircraft design firm founded in the 1980s by Monte Hoskins and based in Salt Lake City, Utah. The company specialized in the design of autogyros in the form of plans for amateur construction for the US FAR 103 Ultralight Vehicles rules.

Hoskins designed the Rotorwing-Aero 3D-RV, first flying it in 1989. The design underwent improvements over time, particularly in incorporating a raised landing gear to eliminate longitudinal stability issues and a three-bladed propeller.

The plans were still available in 1998. At that time Hoskins reported that 35 sets of plans had been delivered, with three aircraft fully completed.

== Aircraft ==
Summary of aircraft built by Rotorwing-Aero
Model name	First flight	Number built	Type
Rotorwing-Aero 3D-RV	1989	At least three	Single-seat autogyro
