= Aviomania =

Cypriot aircraft manufacturer

Aviomania Aircraft
- Company type: Privately held company
- Industry: Aerospace
- Founder: Nicolas Karaolides
- Headquarters: Larnaca, Cyprus
- Products: Autogyros
- Website: www.aviomania.com

Aviomania Aircraft (usually called just Aviomania) is a Cypriot aircraft manufacturer based in Larnaca and founded by Nicolas Karaolides. The company specializes in the design and manufacture of autogyros in the form of kits for amateur construction and ready-to-fly aircraft.

The company describes itself as "the largest ultralight aircraft manufacturer in Cyprus".

Karaolides became a licensed pilot in 1983 and holds degrees in aircraft engineering and electronics. He designed the company's autogyros and also conducted the test flying of the types.

The company initially built the single-seat Rotax 582-powered Aviomania G1SA Genesis Solo autogyro and its two-seat derivative, the Rotax 914-powered Aviomania G2SA Genesis Duo. The G1SA was replaced in production by the enclosed-cockpit Aviomania G1sE Genesis Sport and the open-cockpit Aviomania G1sB Genesis CE models. The company also sells the Best Off Nynja fixed-wing ultralight aircraft.

In a 2015 review, Werner Pfaendler praised the company's design efforts on the G1SE, saying that it, "has been designed with stability and agility in mind. The centre line thrust and the design of the empennage in the propeller slipstream reduces all throttle reactions. The result is a fun machine which is very stable in flight while being very agile and maneuverable."

== Aircraft ==
Summary of aircraft built by Aviomania:

- Aviomania G1SA Genesis Solo
- Aviomania G2SA Genesis Duo
- Aviomania G1sE Genesis Sport
- Aviomania G1sB Genesis CE
