= Codeine (disambiguation) =

Codeine is an opiate substance.

Codeine also may refer to:

- Codeine (band), American rock band (1989-1994, 2012, 2023)
- Codeine, KDE Dragon [video] Player
- "Cod'ine", song written by Buffy Sainte-Marie

== See also ==
- Codeine methylbromide, a chemical derivative of codeine
- Codeine Velvet Club, a Scottish rock band
- "Codeine Crazy", a song by Future
- Cocaine, another (but non-opiate) substance, sometimes described as a “drug”, a "narcotic" or "a narcotic" and also having songs named for it
