= Nagler =

Nagler is a surname. In the Polish language, it has an archaic feminine form, Naglerowa, used as a surname by marriage.

Notable people with the surname include:

- Alfons Nagler (born 1893), German flying ace
- Barney Nagler (1912–1990), American sportswriter and author
- Cathryn Nagler, American immunologist
- Ellen Torelle Nagler (1870–1965), American biologist, author, lecturer
- Eric Nagler (born 1942), American musician
- Georg Kaspar Nagler (1801–1866), German art historian
- Gerald Nagler (1929–2022), Swedish businessman
- Gern Nagler (born 1932), American football player
- Herminia Naglerowa (1890–1957), Polish writer and publicist
- Ivan Nagler (born 1999), Italian luger
- Judah Nagler (born 1980), American singer
- Larry Nagler (born 1940), American tennis player
- Michael N. Nagler (born 1937), American peace activist
- Richard Nagler (born 1947), American businessman
- Stephen E. Nagler (born 1956), Canadian physicist

== See also ==
- 10715 Nagler
