= Calumet Motorsports =

American aircraft parts manufacturer

- Type: Privately held company
- Industry: Aerospace
- Founded: 1970s
- Founder: Tom Milton
- Fate: Sold in 2018
- Headquarters: Lansing, Illinois, United States
- Products: Kit aircraft, aircraft parts
- Website: calumetmanufacturing.com

Calumet Motorsports was an American aircraft parts manufacturer and former aircraft kit manufacturer based in Lansing, Illinois, and founded by Tommy Milton. The company specialized in the design and manufacture of autogyro parts and at one time produced whole aircraft kits for amateur construction in the US including FAR 103 Ultralight Vehicles category.

== History ==
The company was formed in the 1970s as Calumet Aeronautics, nicknamed Cal Aero and acted as a dealer for "Airguide" wind meters. In buying the assets of the SnoBird Aircraft Company the company acquired the rights to the Snobird Charger, single seat gyroplane that offered a ROTAX 503 or 582 ENGINE. SnoBird also offered a 2 place gyroplane that utilized a Honda 4 cylinder aircraft converted engine Snobird Explorer ultralight autogyro designed as an entry level gyroplane. Siting the difficulty ordering parts, destined for use on aircraft. A decision was made to change the company name to Calumet Motorsports. The Calumet designed Explorer Ultralight gyroplane was first flown in May 1997 and produced through the late 1990s and early 2000s when it was noted as a low-cost, entry level aircraft.

The aircraft was commercially successful, but required additional investment to expand production and instead the line was sold. When the SnoBird line came up for sale again later, Calumet Motorsports bought the seat fuel tank business. Later, when parts designer Dick Wunderlich died, the company added the Wunderlich prerotator and rotor brake to their product line.

Milton was also a Federal Aviation Administration Designated Airworthiness Representative (DAR).

The company was sold on 14 December 2018.

== Aircraft ==
Summary of aircraft built by Calumet Motorsports
Model name	First flight	Number built	Type
Calumet Snobird Explorer	May 1997		Single seat autogyro
