= Redback Aviation =

Australian aircraft manufacturer

- Type: Privately held company
- Industry: Aerospace
- Products: Plans and kit helicopters
- Website: www.redbackaviation.com

Redback Aviation is an Australian aircraft manufacturer based in Hoppers Crossing, Victoria. The company is engaged in the development of kit and plans-built helicopter designs for amateur construction.

== History ==
The company was formed to design plans and supply kits for home-built helicopters, initially proposing two designs, which were to be developed concurrently. The Buzzard is a minimalist, open frame, single seat helicopter of limited performance, powered by a Suzuki four stroke automotive engine of 56 kW (75 hp). Only one prototype was completed and this was later sold. The company then turned its attention to designing a more capable helicopter, to be designated the Redback Aviation Spider. By 2014 design work on the Spider was proceeding slowly as outside investment was not sought and resources were limited.

Redback's focus is on traditional methods and where possible, commercial off-the-shelf components, to save money and decrease development time, as well as builder construction time. The company states its design aims as "low maintenance (by comparison to the traditional Rotorway Exec and Scorpion designs), improved safety, and high performance".

The company is named after the venomous Redback spider, which is indigenous to Australia.

== Aircraft ==
Summary of aircraft built by Redback Aviation
Model name	First flight	Number built	Type
Redback Buzzard		1	Single seat, open frame helicopter. Only one prototype constructed.
Redback Aviation Spider		none	Homebuilt helicopter, under development 2014
