= Pawnee Aviation =

Defunct American aircraft manufacturer

- Company type: Privately held company
- Industry: Aerospace
- Founded: mid 1990s
- Founder: Ron Willocks
- Defunct: late 2008
- Fate: Out of business
- Headquarters: McCook, Nebraska, United States
- Products: Kit aircraft
- Number of employees: Five (2005)

Pawnee Aviation was an American aircraft manufacturer initially based in Longmont, Colorado and later in McCook, Nebraska. The company was founded in the mid-1990s by Ron Willocks and specialized in the design and manufacture of helicopters in the form of kits for amateur construction.

The company's first product was the Pawnee Warrior, first flown by 1998. It was a simple open frame, single seat helicopter that was used as a "a proof of concept platform" for the development of the later, two seat Pawnee Chief. The Chief was first flown in December 2005 and was the subject of a protracted development process. The company explained the long development time, "we were determined not to put a product on the market before its time. We have seen other kits sold that did not complete their development and testing. Their customers paid for completion of the development and in reality did much of their testing. By delaying our availability project until it was truly completed, we will avoid placing unnecessary a lot of "Airworthiness Directives" and flight restrictions on our aircraft."

The company intended to put the Chief into production in January 2006 at a rate of eight to ten kits per month and increase staff above the five employees already working. On 28 September 2006 a Chief crashed while hovering and burned, with only minor injuries to the pilot and passenger. The National Transportation Safety Board determined the cause to be, "failure of the welded bracket caused the loss of input control authority from the cyclic control to the main rotor." The company seems to have gone out of business in late 2008.

== Aircraft ==
Summary of aircraft built by Pawnee Aviation
Model name	First flight	Number built	Type
Pawnee Warrior	mid-1990s	One prototype	Single seat open frame helicopter
Pawnee Chief	December 2005	At least three	Two-seat helicopter
