= GEN Corporation =

- Company type: Privately held company
- Industry: Aerospace
- Headquarters: Matsumoto, Nagano, Japan
- Products: Helicopters
- Website: en.gen-corp.jp

GEN Corporation of Japan developed a personal helicopter named the GEN H-4, but production was deferred pending large enough orders to make the aircraft economical.

The company also developed the GEN 125, a very small 8 hp (6 kW), twin-cylinder, two-stroke aircraft engine to power the H-4. The engine weighs 3 kg (6.6 lb) and four are used in the H-4 design to provide redundancy.

The company does not have any fixed location, but has carried out its development work in borrowed facilities.

The company name translates as "fountain of wisdom".
