= Clout (nail) =

Relatively short, thick nail with a large, flat head

A clout or clout nail is a relatively short, thick nail with a large, flat head, used for attaching sheet material to wooden frames or to sheet. A typical use involves fixing roofing felt to the top of a shed. Clout nails are also used in timber fence palings. They are usually made of galvanised mild steel, but copper clouts are also available.
