= Redback Buzzard =

Australian homebuilt helicopter

Buzzard

General information
- Type: Helicopter
- National origin: Australia
- Manufacturer: Redback Aviation
- Status: Production completed (2013)
- Number built: one

History
- Developed from: Star Aviation LoneStar

The Redback Buzzard is an Australian helicopter that was designed and produced by Redback Aviation of Hoppers Crossing, Victoria. The aircraft was intended to be supplied as a kit for amateur construction, but only one prototype was ever completed and development ended.

== Design and development ==
The Buzzard was based on the second generation Star Aviation LoneStar helicopter to which Redback own the rights. The Buzzard was designed to be a minimalist helicopter, using a maximum of off-the-shelf parts and to comply with the homebuilt aircraft rules. It features a single main rotor, a single-seat open cockpit without a windshield, skid-type landing gear and a Suzuki 75 hp (56 kW) four stroke engine.

The aircraft fuselage is made from bolted-together aluminum tubing, with the tailboom built from carbon fibre. Its 6.10 m (20.0 ft) diameter two-bladed rotor has a chord of 20 cm (7.9 in), with anti-torque handled by a conventional two-bladed tail rotor. The main rotor transmission uses a combination of V-belts and toothed belts. Pitch link controls are mounted inside the hollow rotor mast tube. The aircraft has an empty weight of 193 kg (425 lb) and a gross weight of 386 kg (851 lb), giving a useful load of 193 kg (425 lb). With full fuel of 58.8 litres (12.9 imp gal; 15.5 US gal) the payload is 151 kg (333 lb).

The company indicates that only one prototype was built and that it was sold, ending development of the aircraft, in favour of a new design, the Redback Aviation Spider.

== Specifications (version) ==
Data from Bayerl

General characteristics

- Crew: one
- Empty weight: 192 kg (423 lb)
- Gross weight: 386 kg (851 lb)
- Fuel capacity: 58.5 litres (12.9 imp gal; 15.5 US gal)
- Powerplant: 1 × Suzuki four stroke automotive engine, 56 kW (75 hp)
- Main rotor diameter: 6.10 m (20 ft 0 in)

Performance

- Maximum speed: 169 km/h (105 mph, 91 kn)
- Cruise speed: 145 km/h (90 mph, 78 kn)
- Rate of climb: 5.0 m/s (980 ft/min)
