= Villamil Libélula Viblandi =

Early Spanish experimental helicopter

Libélula Viblandi
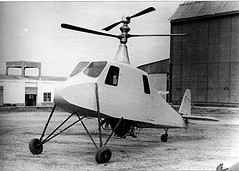

General information
- Type: Experimental helicopter
- Manufacturer: Villamil
- Designer: Federico Cantero Villamil
- Number built: 1

The Libélula Viblandi, or Libélula Española (Spanish dragonfly), was an early helicopter developed from 1924 by Federico Cantero Villamil, a Spanish civil engineer also known for the dams he constructed and planned along the river Duero.

== The project ==
Federico Cantero Villamil founded a workshop with precision machinery purchased in 1900 at the Universal Exposition in Paris. He began his experiments on "rotating wings" (a kind of propeller invented by him) in Zamora in 1908, and two years later he was patenting a

"...procedure or idea in order to obtain the lift of a body or apparatus on the air, as well as the propulsion if wanted, both things simultaneous or not, by means of special wheels of one or more blades, jointed, moveable, gradually leaning, depending on the variation and form explained in the body of the current Memory."

Several patents on propellers were developed between 1912 and 1936; as a consequence, Villamil began to construct his helicopter in 1935, assisted by Pedro Blanco Pedraza, a young student of aeronautical engineering, and Antonio Díaz, the owner of a precision engineering workshop. The names of these three people form the acronym VIBLANDI which was the definitive name of the helicopter.

In July 1936 the Spanish Civil War began, and the construction of the helicopter was interrupted until 1940. In September 1941 the helicopter was completed, with testing commencing in October 1941, with unknown results. During the next years Villamil improved the helicopter, registered three more patents, and continued testing the machine. Photographs show the aircraft with a three-bladed rotor of relatively large diameter with a three-bladed tail rotor above the rear fuselage, most sources describe these photographs as the second prototype, but there is no other evidence to suggest that Villamil built a second airframe.

== Patents ==
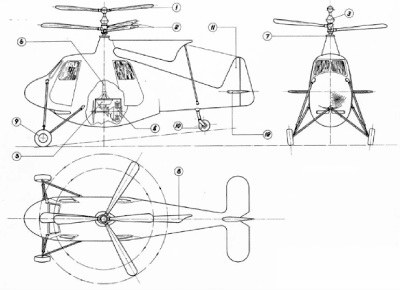
Drawing 3 views of the Libélula Viblandi.

The helicopter was patented under the name Libélula Viblandi in 1940 with registration number 149788 at the Spanish Office of Patents and Trademarks. This and other patents on propellers by Federico Cantero Villamil that led to the Libélula española may be found at the Oficina española de patentes y marcas.

== Sources ==
The works of Villamil were forgotten for many years, but they have been recently rediscovered by Isabel Díaz de Aguilar and Federico Suárez Caballero, based on the patents he registered and two books written by Cantero about the Libélula Española.

== See also ==
- Juan de la Cierva
- Autogyro
- Igor Sikorsky

== Bibliography ==
- CABALLERO, FEDERICO SUÁREZ (2006). FEDERICO CANTERO VILLAMIL. CRÓNICA DE UNA VOLUNTAD. EL HOMBRE, EL INVENTOR (in Spanish). Arts & Press.
- Villén, Adolfo Roldán (2005). "Libélula Viblandi". Aeroplano. Revista de Historia Aeronáutica (in Spanish) (23): 28–37.
- Villamil, Federico Cantero (1945). Helicóptero \"Libélula Española\". Estudios y Patentes Relativos a la Propulsión por Reacción de los Aviones. Realizaciones del Helicóptero tipo: 1935-1936 (in Spanish). Madrid: Federico Cantero Villamil.
- VILLAMIL, Federico CANTERO. PATENTES SOBRE HELICÓPTEROS (in Spanish). Madrid: CANTERO VILLAMIL, Federico.
- Cantero, Isabel Díaz de Aguilar; Caballero, Federico Suárez. Federico Cantera Villamil: Entre la desmemoria y el revisionismo (PDF) (in Spanish).
