= Windspire Inc. =

American aircraft design firm

- Company type: Privately held company
- Industry: Aerospace
- Fate: Out of business
- Headquarters: Long Green, Maryland, United States
- Products: Helicopters
- Website: www.windspire.com former location

Windspire Inc. was an American aircraft design firm based in Long Green, Maryland. The company specialized in the design of helicopters in the form of plans for amateur construction.

The company produced plans for the Windspire Aeros, a single seat helicopter powered by a four-cylinder, air-cooled, four-stroke, 97 hp (72 kW) Volkswagen air-cooled engine. The design includes a drive train based on Volkswagen gears.

== Aircraft ==
Summary of aircraft built by Windspire Inc.
Model name	First flight	Number built	Type
Windspire Aeros	1990s	3 (1998)	Single seat helicopter
