= Continental Copters =

Continental Copters was a US helicopter remanufacturer established by John L Scott in Fort Worth, Texas in 1959. The company's most significant product was the remanufacturing of Bell 47 airframes as specialised, single-seat agricultural aircraft as the El Tomcat. Continental Copters also assembled stock Bell 47s from spare parts.

In the late 1970s, Continental worked on single-seat agricultural versions of the Bell 204 and 206, the latter flying as the Jet-Cat.
