= GEN H-4 =

Japanese helicopter design

H-4
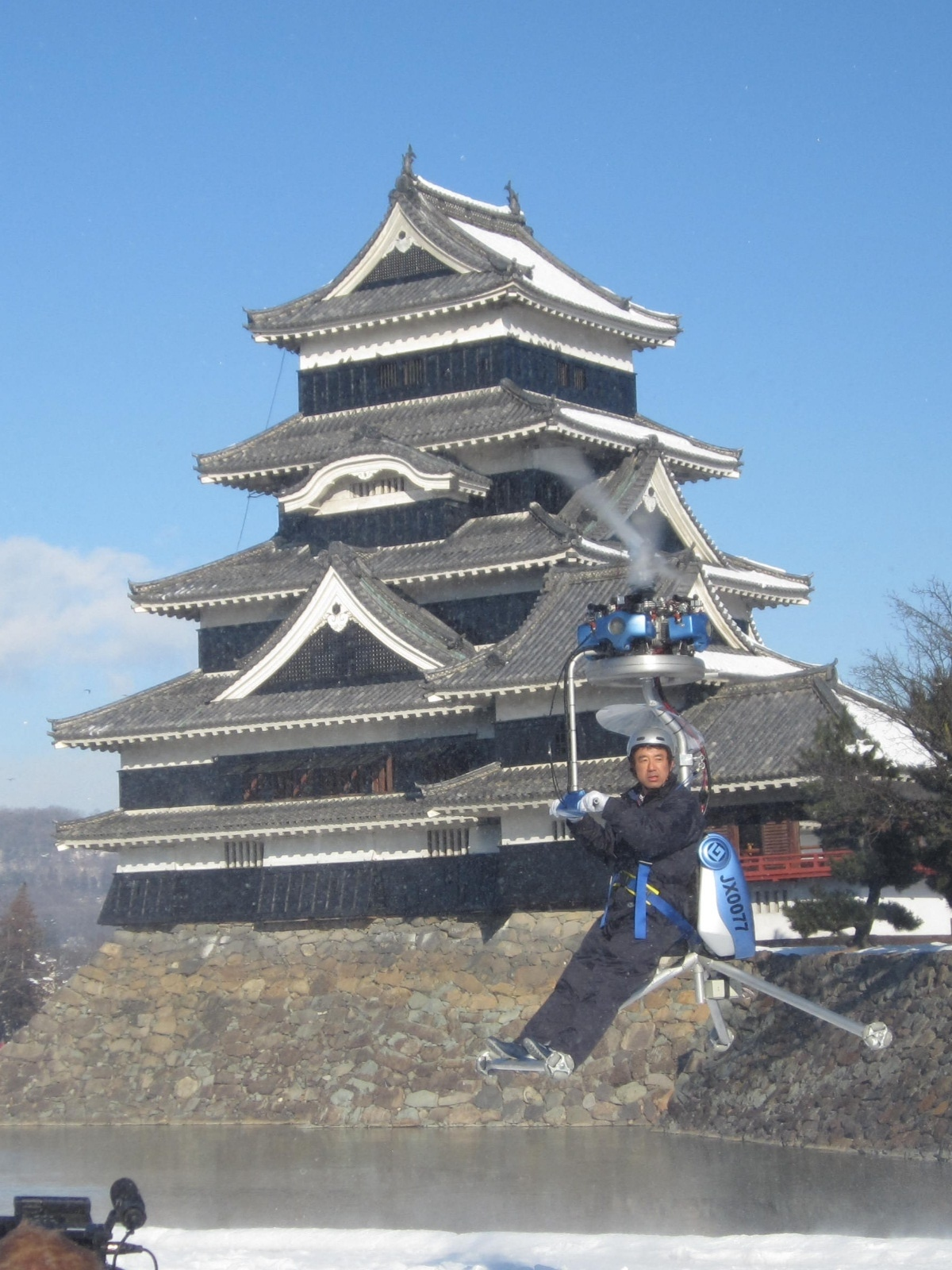

General information
- Type: Helicopter
- National origin: Japan
- Manufacturer: GEN Corporation
- Status: Production suspended (2012)
- Number built: Prototypes only

The GEN H-4 is a Japanese ultralight coaxial helicopter under development by GEN Corporation of Nagano. The aircraft is intended to be supplied as a kit for amateur construction.

== Design and development ==
The H-4 was designed to comply with the United States FAR 103 Ultralight Vehicles rules, including the category's maximum empty weight of 115 kg (254 lb). The aircraft has a standard empty weight of 70 kg (154 lb). It features two contra-rotating main rotors, a single-seat open cockpit without a windshield, four-wheeled landing gear and four twin-cylinder, air-cooled, two-stroke, 10 hp (7 kW) GEN 125-F engines to provide operational redundancy since the aircraft cannot autorotate in the event of a power failure.

The aircraft fuselage is a simple open frame with a seat mounted on it. Its two coaxial, contra-rotating two-bladed rotors have diameters of 4 m (13.1 ft). The main rotors are both of fixed pitch design, with no articulation in any axis. Steering is accomplished by pivoting the rotor head on a gimbal using a control handle, in a similar manner to a weight shift hang glider. Climb and descent is controlled by increasing and decreasing the throttle. The aircraft lacks a tail rotor, as the coaxial, contra-rotating main rotors produce zero net torque. Yawing motion is produced and controlled by electronic gyroscopically-controlled differential electric braking of the main rotors. With its empty weight of 70 kg (154 lb) and a gross weight of 220 kg (485 lb) the H-4 has a useful load of 150 kg (331 lb). With full fuel of 19 litres (4.2 imp gal; 5.0 US gal) the payload is 136 kg (300 lb).

The company indicated that it had suspended production plans by 2012 due to lack of dealers outside Japan and put the cost of a single H-4 at ¥7,500,000.00 (about US$80,887.59 in 2013). The company stated that it could build the aircraft economically only in lots of ten and at a discounted rate only in lots of one hundred. To facilitate future production, the company indicated that it was "looking for sponsors, investors and partners".

== Variants ==
H-4
Initial model powered by four twin-cylinder, air-cooled, two-stroke, 10 hp (7 kW) GEN 125-F engines
H-4E
Electrically-powered model under development
H-4R
Remote-control model under development

== Accidents ==
On 29 June 2000, the prototype H-4, registered JX0076, was on a test flight at the company plant in Matsumoto-City, Nagano. The pilot was hovering, when the H-4 was hit by a wind gust and contacted the building, 40 m (131 ft) to the northwest and then impacted the ground. The pilot was injured and the airframe damaged.

== Specifications (H-4) ==
Data from Bayerl, Tacke and helistart.com

General characteristics

- Crew: one
- Empty weight: 70 kg (154 lb)
- Gross weight: 220 kg (485 lb)
- Fuel capacity: 19 litres (4.2 imp gal; 5.0 US gal)
- Powerplant: 4 × GEN 125-F two-cylinder, air-cooled, two-stroke engines, 7.5 kW (10 hp) each
- Main rotor diameter: × 4 m (13 ft 1 in)

Performance

- Maximum speed: 200 km/h (120 mph, 110 kn)
- Cruise speed: 100 km/h (62 mph, 54 kn)
- Range: 80 km (50 mi, 43 nmi)
- Service ceiling: 3,000 m (10,000 ft)
- Rate of climb: 4 m/s (790 ft/min)
