= Trendak Tercel =

Polish autogyro

Tercel
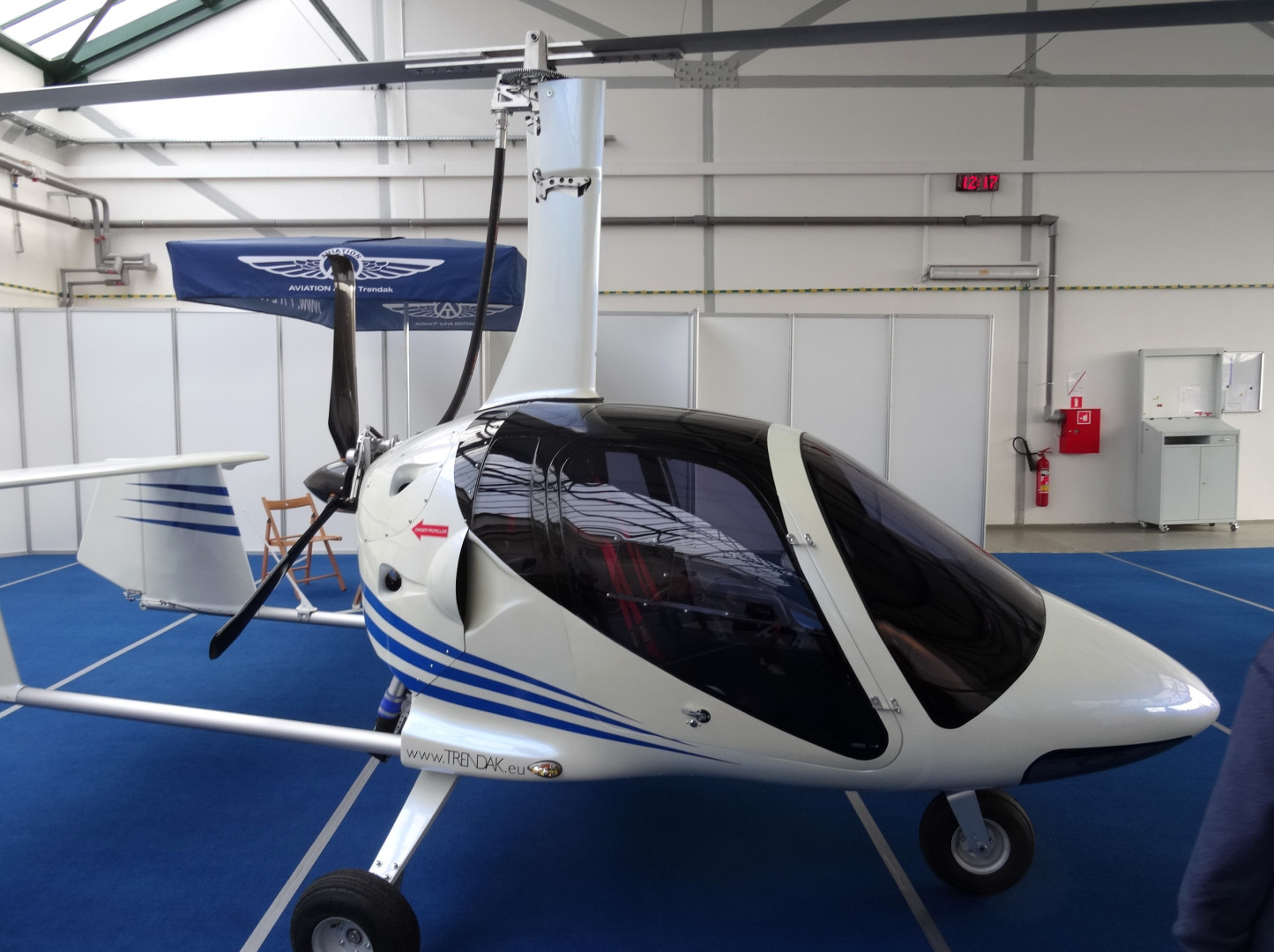

General information
- Type: Autogyro
- National origin: Poland
- Manufacturer: Aviation Artur Trendak
- Status: In production (2017)

History
- Manufactured: 2014–present
- Introduction date: 2014

The Trendak Tercel (transl. a male falcon) is a Polish autogyro designed and produced by Aviation Artur Trendak of Jaktorów-Kolonia, Poland, introduced at the AERO Friedrichshafen show in 2014. The aircraft is supplied complete and ready-to-fly.

== Design and development ==
The Tercel is one of three similar designs that were all unveiled at the same time and which share common components. The Twistair is a tandem development, while the Trooper is a military variant with sideways facing seats for troop transport.

The Tercel features a single main rotor, a two-seats-in side-by-side configuration in completely enclosed cockpit with a windshield, tricycle landing gear with wheel pants and a four-cylinder, air-cooled, turbocharged, intercooled, twin carburetor, four-stroke, 122 hp (91 kW) CA 912 ULT (RST) engine in pusher configuration.

The aircraft fuselage is made from composite material. Its Trendak & Son aluminum, two-bladed rotor has a diameter of 8.4 m (27.6 ft). The aircraft has a typical empty weight of 285 kg (628 lb) and a gross weight of 560 kg (1,235 lb), giving a useful load of 275 kg (606 lb). With full fuel of 120 litres (26 imp gal; 32 US gal) in two tanks, the payload for the pilot, passenger and baggage is 189 kg (417 lb).

== Specifications (Tercel) ==
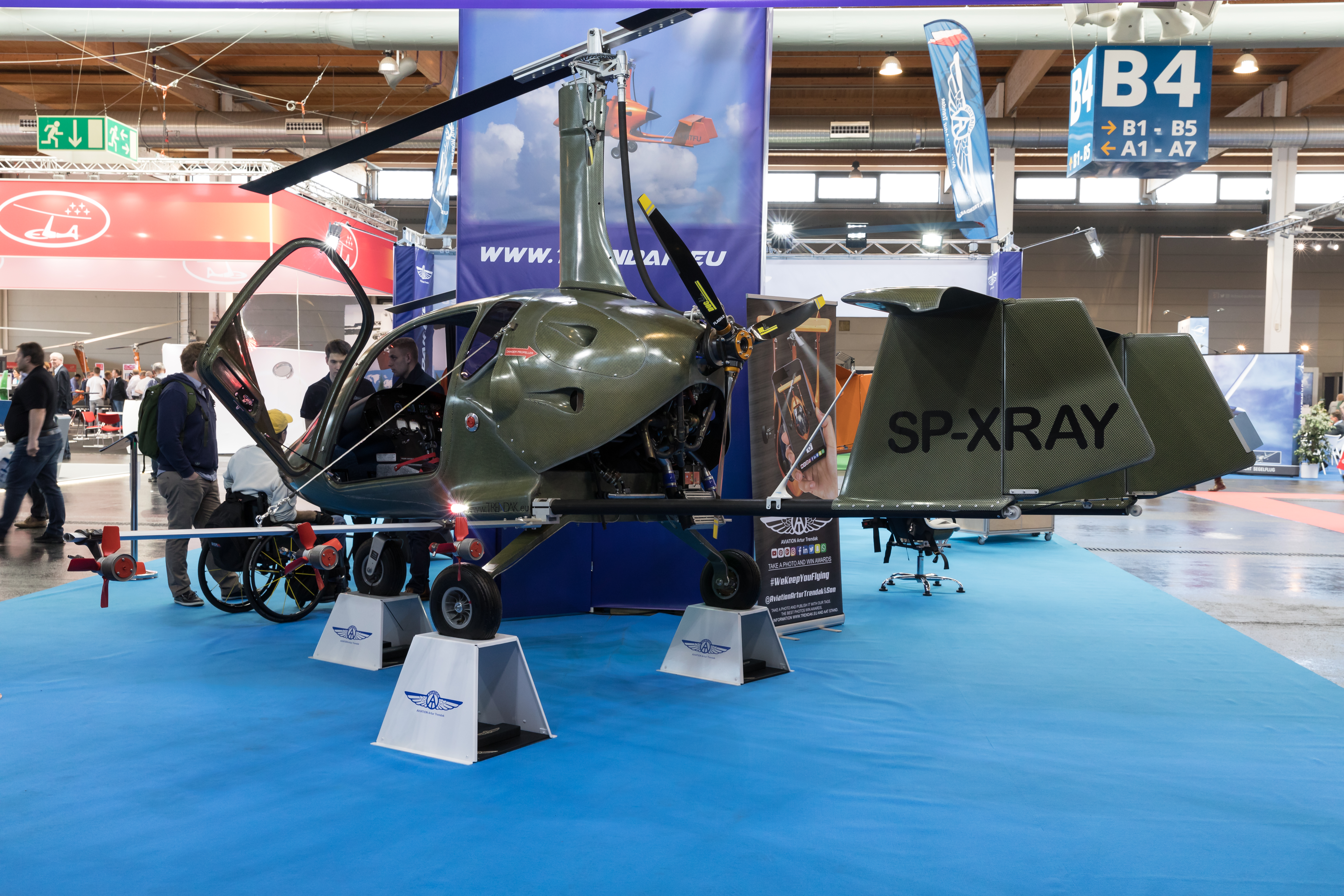
Trendak Tercel Pro at AERO Friedrichshafen 2018

Data from Tacke

General characteristics

- Crew: one
- Capacity: one passenger
- Length: 4.9 m (16 ft 1 in)
- Width: 2.2 m (7 ft 3 in)
- Height: 2.8 m (9 ft 2 in)
- Empty weight: 285 kg (628 lb)
- Gross weight: 560 kg (1,235 lb)
- Fuel capacity: 120 litres (26 imp gal; 32 US gal) in two 60 litres (13 imp gal; 16 US gal) tanks
- Powerplant: 1 × CA 912 ULT (RST) four cylinder, air-cooled, turbocharged, intercooled, twin carburetor, four stroke aircraft engine, 91 kW (122 hp)
- Main rotor diameter: 8.4 m (27 ft 7 in)
- Main rotor area: 55.4 m^{2} (596 sq ft) Trendak & Son aluminum
- Propellers: 5-bladed Kaspar KA-2/3, 1.740 m (5 ft 9 in) diameter

Performance

- Maximum speed: 175 km/h (109 mph, 94 kn)
- Cruise speed: 140 km/h (87 mph, 76 kn) minimum speed 50 km/h
- Never exceed speed: 210 km/h (130 mph, 110 kn)
- Range: 800 km (500 mi, 430 nmi) no reserves
- Endurance: 6 hours
- Service ceiling: 4,500 m (14,800 ft)
- Maximum glide ratio: 3:1
- Rate of climb: 6.1 m/s (1,200 ft/min)
- Disk loading: 10.1 kg/m^{2} (2.1 lb/sq ft)

== See also ==
- List of rotorcraft
