= Nova Coden =

Polish autogyro

General information
- Type: Autogyro
- National origin: Poland
- Manufacturer: Nova Sp. z.o.o.
- Status: Under development (2015)
- Number built: One prototype

The Nova Coden is a Polish autogyro under development by Nova Sp. z.o.o. of Gdynia. Intended to be type certified, it is planned that the aircraft will be supplied complete and ready-to-fly.

== Design and development ==
The Coden features a single main rotor, a two-seats-in tandem enclosed cockpit with a windshield, tricycle landing gear with wheel pants, plus a tail caster and a modified turbocharged four-cylinder, liquid and air-cooled, four stroke 120 hp (89 kW) Rotax 912 engine in pusher configuration.

The aircraft fuselage has an unusual multi-faceted design, based on the boxfish. The design allows the mounting of additional baggage and special mission equipment and incorporates patented main landing gear. The aircraft has a typical empty weight of 265 kg (584 lb) and a gross weight of 500 kg (1,102 lb), giving a useful load of 235 kg (518 lb).

As of 2015 a prototype was reported to have been completed and certification flight testing was expected to begin.

== Specifications (Coden) ==
Data from Tacke and manufacturer

General characteristics

- Crew: one
- Capacity: one passenger
- Empty weight: 265 kg (584 lb)
- Gross weight: 500 kg (1,102 lb)
- Powerplant: 1 × Rotax 912ULS modified turbocharged, four cylinder, liquid and air-cooled, four stroke aircraft engine, 89 kW (120 hp)
- Propellers: 3-bladed ground adjustable

Performance

- Maximum speed: 180 km/h (110 mph, 97 kn)
- Cruise speed: 140 km/h (87 mph, 76 kn)
- Range: 600 km (370 mi, 320 nmi)
- Rate of climb: 6 m/s (1,200 ft/min)

== See also ==
- List of rotorcraft
