= Clout Mechanical Air-Ship =

Experimental British helicopter

Mechanical Air-Ship
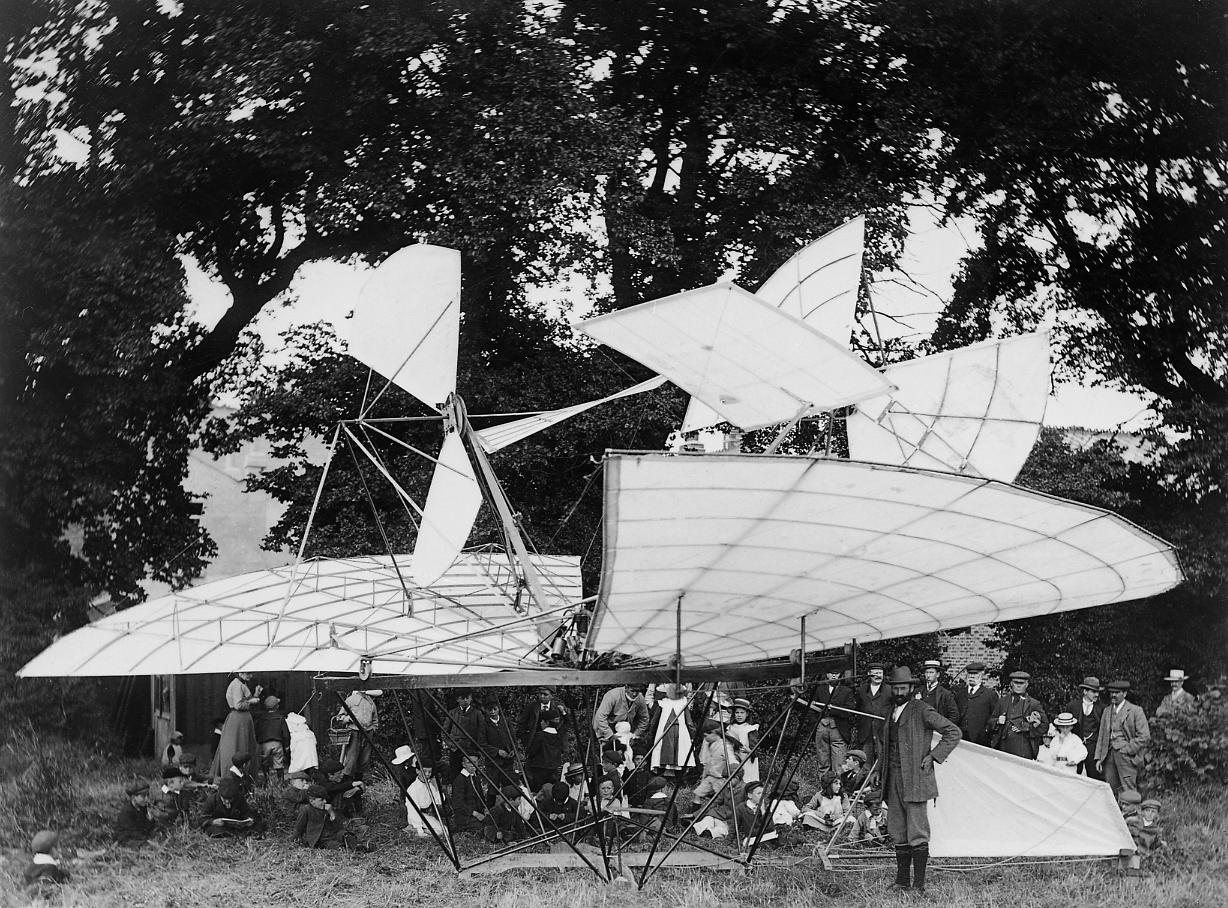
- George Clout, in front of his Mechanical Air-Ship

General information
- Type: unpiloted helicopter
- National origin: Great Britain
- Manufacturer: George Clout
- Number built: 1

History
- Introduction date: 1903

The Clout Mechanical Air-Ship was a British un-manned helicopter, designed and built by George Clout of Durrington, West Sussex during the early 1900s.

== Design ==
Clout was a tradesman who, in 1904, was reported to have spent "thirteen or fourteen years studying the problem of aerial navigation". Inspired by a toy helicopter, he designed and built a helicopter comprising two large fan-shaped rotor blades which rotated by running along a circular steel rail. The fuselage was a trellis-like structure made of oak and steel tubing which supported the circular rail as well as a rudder assembly. The rotor blades each have three transverse trussed spars located on their upper side.

An air-cooled 3.75 hp (2.80 kW) petrol engine, located at the base of the rotor assembly, powered, via a belt drive, propellers that were sited above each rotor blade. Each propeller had two fan-shaped blades, and had a square-shaped canard surface positioned just ahead of it.

Clout stated that due to the weight of its construction, that the Mechanical Air-Ship would not be able to support the weight of an occupant, but had it been built using lighter material such as aluminium, then it could have. He anticipated that a crewed version of his aircraft would be controlled by the occupant shifting his weight about.

== Operational history ==
Clout debuted the machine in 1903. It was tested in a field in Worthing, West Sussex, but failed to lift off the ground. On 11 June 1903, he submitted a patent application for a "Mechanical Air-Ship", but the application does not seem to have progressed.

After failing to win support for his idea from the War Office, Clout travelled to Montreal, Canada in November 1905, and then to New York in early 1906, in order to raise capital "for the purpose of building a practical machine." In May 1906, due to ill-health Clout decided to return to Great Britain, but he died en route, and was buried at sea.

== Specifications ==
Data from British Aircraft Before the Great War

General characteristics

- Capacity: 0
- Empty weight: 350 lb (159 kg)
- Main rotor diameter: 30 ft (9.1 m)

Performance

== See also ==
Aircraft of comparable role, configuration, and era

- Brennan Helicopter
- de Bothezat helicopter
- Curtiss-Bleecker SX-5-1 Helicopter
- Ortego Helicopter
- Saunders Helicogyre
