= Continental Copters El Tomcat =

El Tomcat
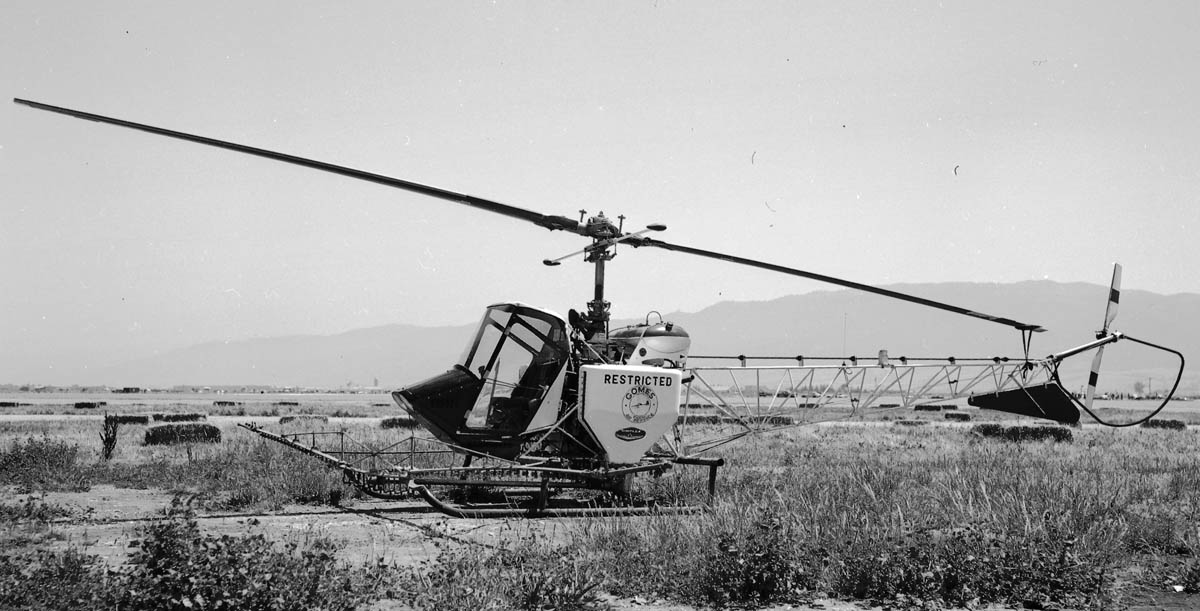

General information
- Type: Agricultural helicopter
- Manufacturer: Continental Copters

History
- First flight: 1959

The Continental Copters El Tomcat was a 1950s American single-seat agricultural helicopter converted from a Bell 47G by Continental Copters of Fort Worth Texas. The first helicopter (the El Tomcat II) first flew in 1959 and was followed by a number of variants.

== Variants ==
El Tomcat Mk.II
Bell 47G-2 modified extensively for agricultural spraying. First flew in April 1959.
El Tomcat Mk.III
Improved version of the Mk.II, it first flew in April 1965.
El Tomcat Mk.IIIA
Powered by the Franklin 6V4-200, 6V-335, or 6V-350 engines.
El Tomcat Mk.IIIB
Featured a modified fiberglass nose with a repositioned windscreen and a lower cabin roof, and was powered by the 235 hp Franklin 6V-350-A. Produced in 1967.
El Tomcat Mk.IIIC
Improved version with 200 hp Franklin 6V4-200-C32, 210 hp 6V-335-A, or 235 hp 6V-350-A engines.
El Tomcat Mk.V
First flown in June 1968, it was powered by a 220 hp Lycoming VO-435-A1A.
El Tomcat Mk.V-A
Powered by a 260 hp Lycoming VO-435-A1F with a foldable jump-seat.
El Tomcat Mk.V-B
Powered by a 265 hp Lycoming VO-435-B1A.

== Specifications (V-A) ==
Data from Aircraft World Directory

General characteristics

- Crew: 1
- Length: 31 ft 7 in (9.63 m)
- Height: 2.87 ft 9.5 in (1.116 m)
- Empty weight: 1,375 lb (623 kg)
- Gross weight: 2,450 lb (1,111 kg)
- Powerplant: 1 × Lycoming TVO-435 , 260 hp (194 kW)
- Main rotor diameter: 37 ft 1.5 in (11.32 m)

Performance

- Cruise speed: 65 mph (104 km/h, 56 kn)
