= Long Green, Maryland =

Unincorporated community in Maryland, United States

- Unincorporated community
- Location within the State of Maryland Long Green, Maryland (the United States)
- Coordinates: 39°28′22″N 076°31′23″W
- Country: United States
- State: Maryland
- County: Baltimore
- Time zone: UTC-5 (Eastern (EST))
  - Summer (DST): UTC-4 (EDT)
- ZIP code: 21092
- GNIS feature ID: 590695

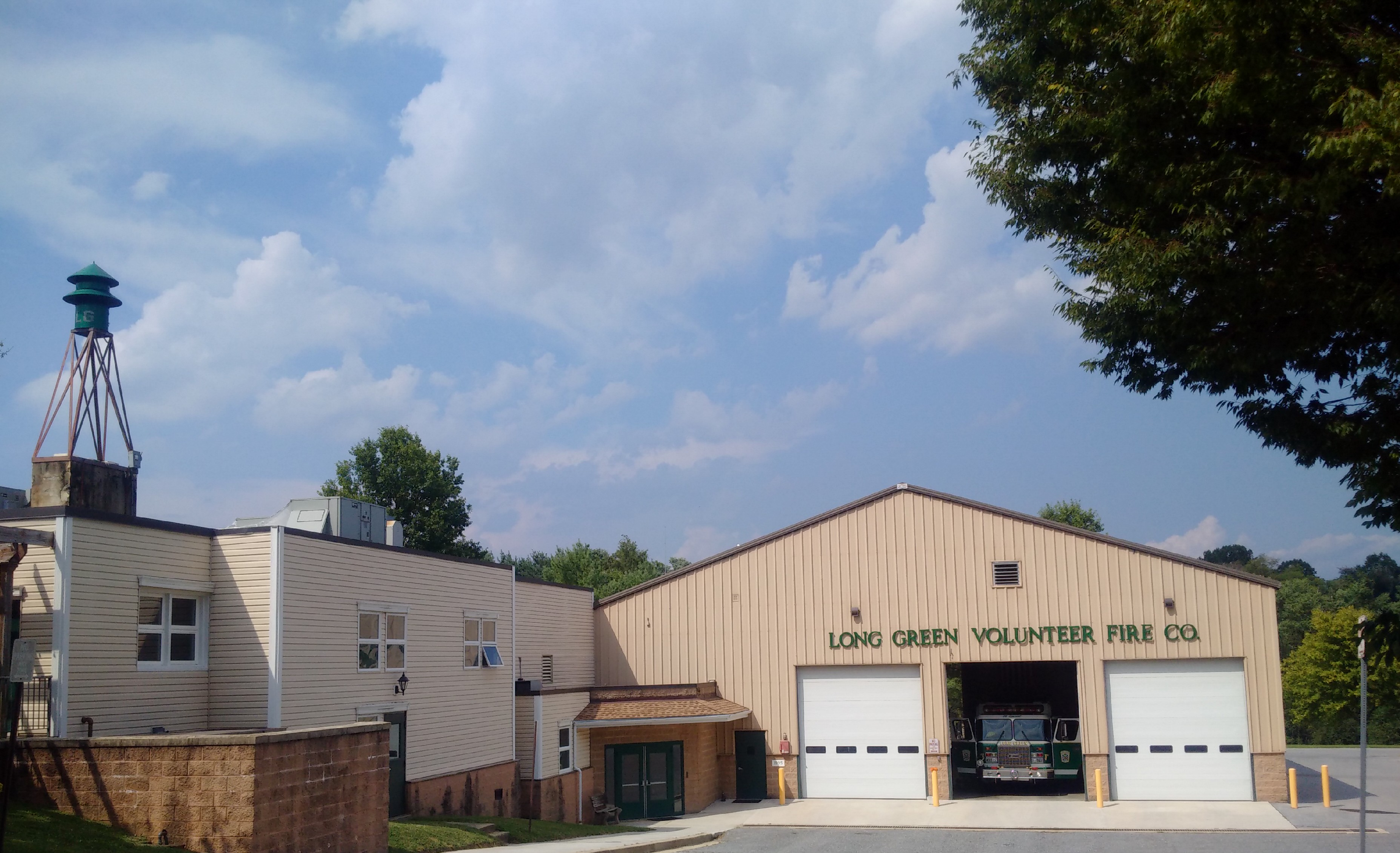
Long Green Volunteer Fire Co. station

Long Green is an unincorporated community in Baltimore County, Maryland, United States. Until 1958, the community was served by the Maryland and Pennsylvania Railroad at milepost 15.8. Prospect Hill was listed on the National Register of Historic Places in 1973.

Long Green was once home to an Amish community. The Amish community in Long Green was founded in 1833 and lasted for 120 years, before disappearing in the 1950s. The community was founded by Lancaster County Amish, but few settlers moved to the area because Maryland was a slave state at the time. Few Amish people crossed the Mason–Dixon line, due to the Amish opposition to slavery. An Amish meetinghouse was constructed in 1899, but the community never grew large. The community dwindled in size over time, with the last Amish person dying in 1953.

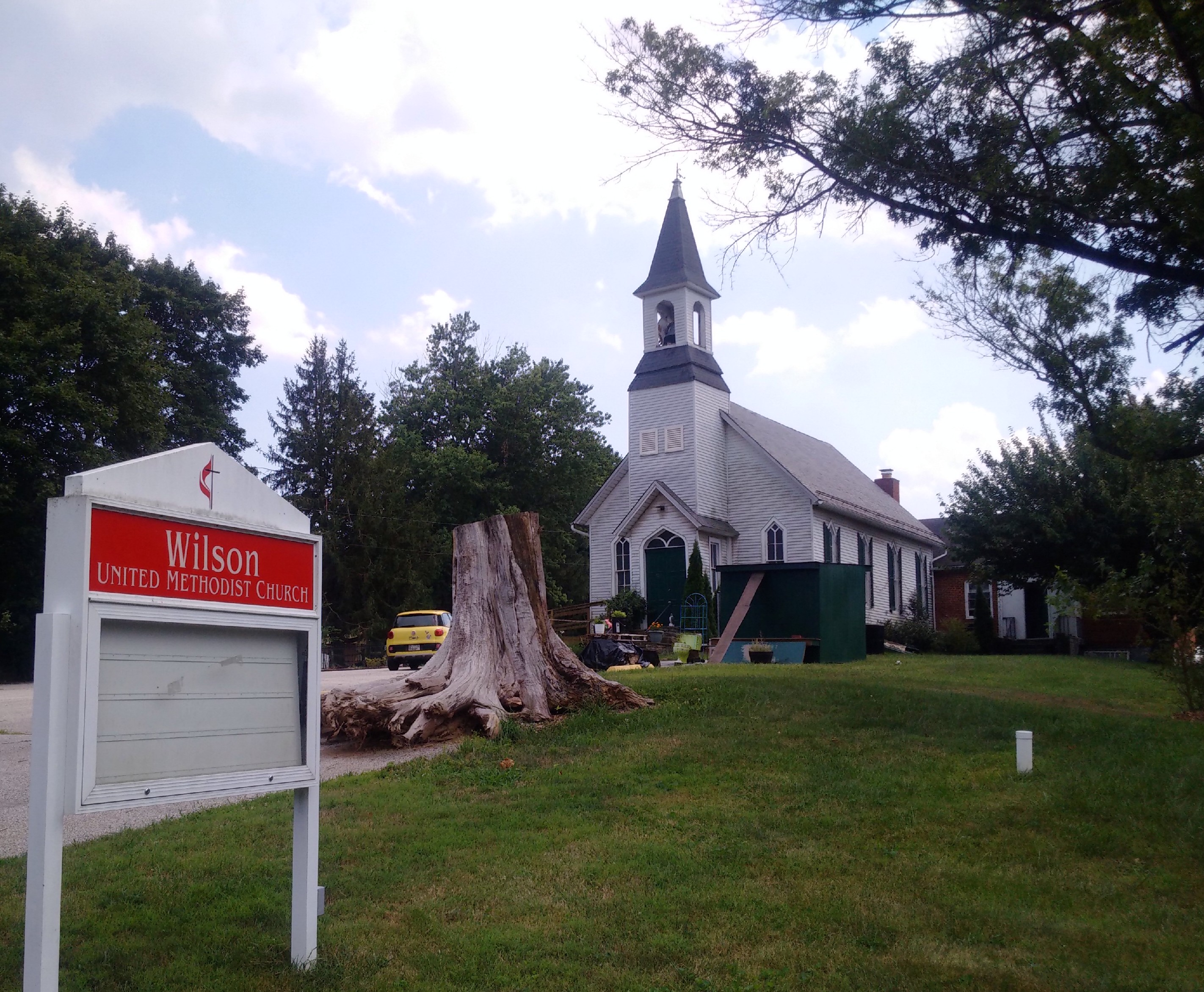
Wilson Methodist Church, built 1892

One of the oldest buildings in Long Green is the Wilson United Methodist Church, built in 1892 in the Gothic Revival style. A previous Methodist meeting house was built in 1839 on land donated by George Wilson, for whom the present church is named. In 1787, noted Methodist leader Francis Asbury preached in the Long Green farmhouse of Wilson's great-uncle. The church's cemetery dates back to the 1850s.
