= NOTAR =

Helicopter tail system with no external tail rotor

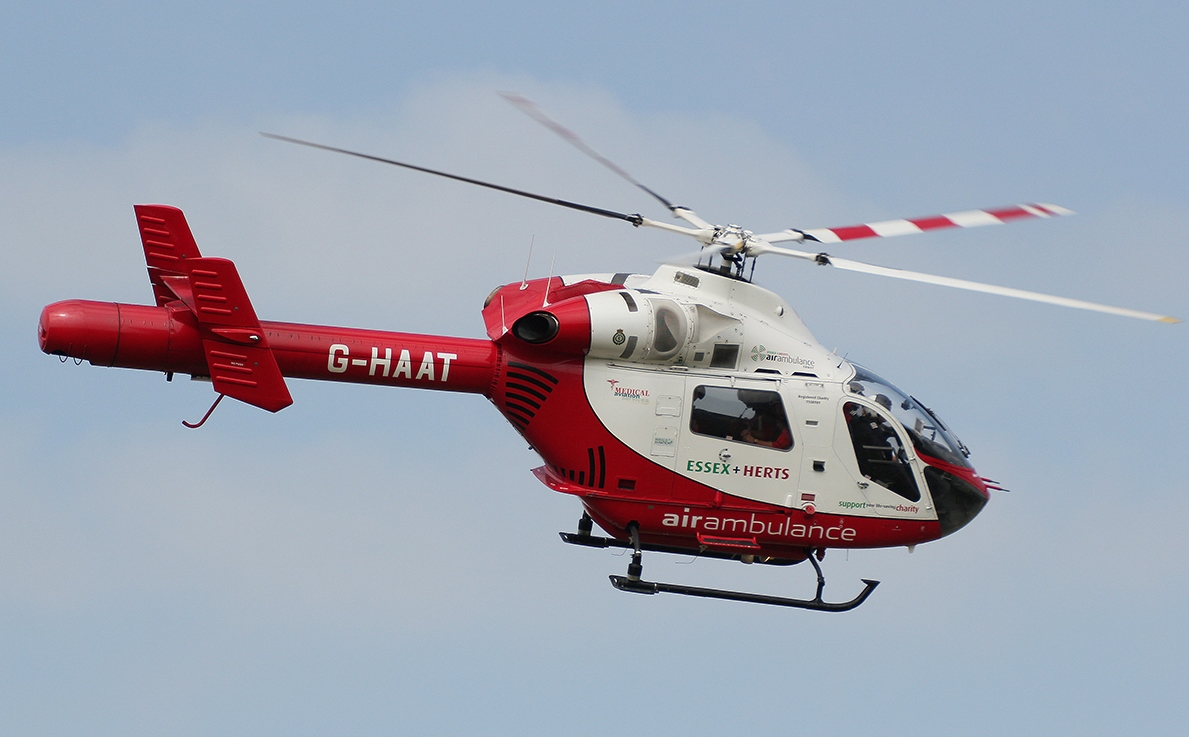
MD Explorer air ambulance

NOTAR ("no tail rotor") is a helicopter system which avoids the use of a tail rotor. It was developed by McDonnell Douglas Helicopter Systems (through their acquisition of Hughes Helicopters). The system uses a fan inside the tail boom to build a high volume of low-pressure air, which exits through two slots and creates a boundary layer flow of air along the tailboom utilizing the Coandă effect. The boundary layer changes the direction of airflow around the tailboom, creating thrust opposite the motion imparted to the fuselage by the torque effect of the main rotor. Directional control is gained through a vented, rotating drum at the end of the tailboom, called the direct jet thruster. Advocates of NOTAR assert that the system offers quieter and safer operation than a traditional tail rotor.

== Development ==
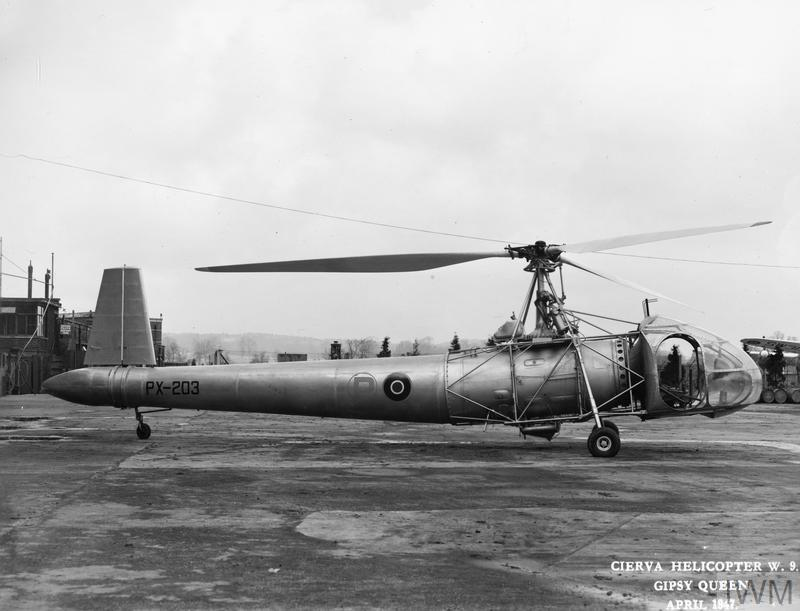
The Cierva W.9 showing the long tailboom from which the efflux from the engine-driven fan emerged from a directable vent on the left side at the tip of the tailboom

The use of directed air to provide anti-torque control had been tested as early as 1945 in the British Cierva W.9. During 1957, a Spanish prototype designed and built by Aerotecnica flew using exhaust gases from the turbine instead of a tail rotor. This model was designated as Aerotecnica AC-14. The Fiat 7005 used a pusher propeller that blew against a cascade of tail vanes at the rear of its fuselage.

Development of the NOTAR system dates back to 1975, when engineers at Hughes Helicopters began concept development work. On December 17, 1981, Hughes flew an OH-6A fitted with NOTAR for the first time. The OH-6A helicopter (serial number 65-12917) was supplied by the U.S. Army for Hughes to develop the NOTAR technology and was the second OH-6 built by Hughes for the U.S. Army. A more heavily modified version of the prototype demonstrator first flew in March 1986 (by which time McDonnell Douglas had acquired Hughes Helicopters). The original prototype last flew in June 1986 and is now at the U.S. Army Aviation Museum in Fort Novosel, Alabama.

A production model NOTAR 520N (N520NT) was later produced and first flew on May 1, 1990. It collided with an Apache AH-64D and crashed on September 27, 1994 while flying as a chase aircraft for the Apache.

== Concept ==
Although the concept took over three years to refine, the NOTAR system is simple in theory and works to provide some directional control using the Coandă effect. A variable pitch fan is enclosed in the aft fuselage section immediately forward of the tail boom and driven by the main rotor transmission. This fan forces low pressure air through two slots on the right side of the tailboom, (Note: NOTAR is an American-designed system and so this is true for American-made helicopters whose main rotors rotate counterclockwise (viewed from above). Many helicopters made elsewhere, such as France and Russia, have clockwise rotating main rotors and with the opposite resultant torque would require the slots to be on the left.) causing the downwash from the main rotor to hug the tail boom, producing lift, and thus a measure of directional control. This is augmented by a direct jet thruster and vertical stabilisers.

Benefits of the NOTAR system include increased safety (the tail rotor being vulnerable), and greatly reduced external noise as tail rotors on helicopters produce much of the aircraft's sound. NOTAR-equipped helicopters are among the quietest helicopters certified by FAA.

1 Air intake 2 Variable pitch fan 3 Tail boom with Coandă Slots 4 Vertical stabilizers 5 Direct jet thruster 6 Downwash 7 Circulation control tailboom cross-section 8 Anti-torque lift

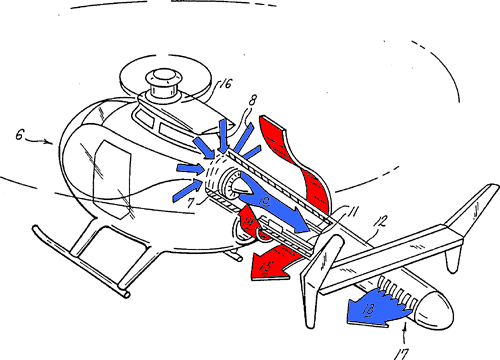
Diagram showing the movement of air through the NOTAR system

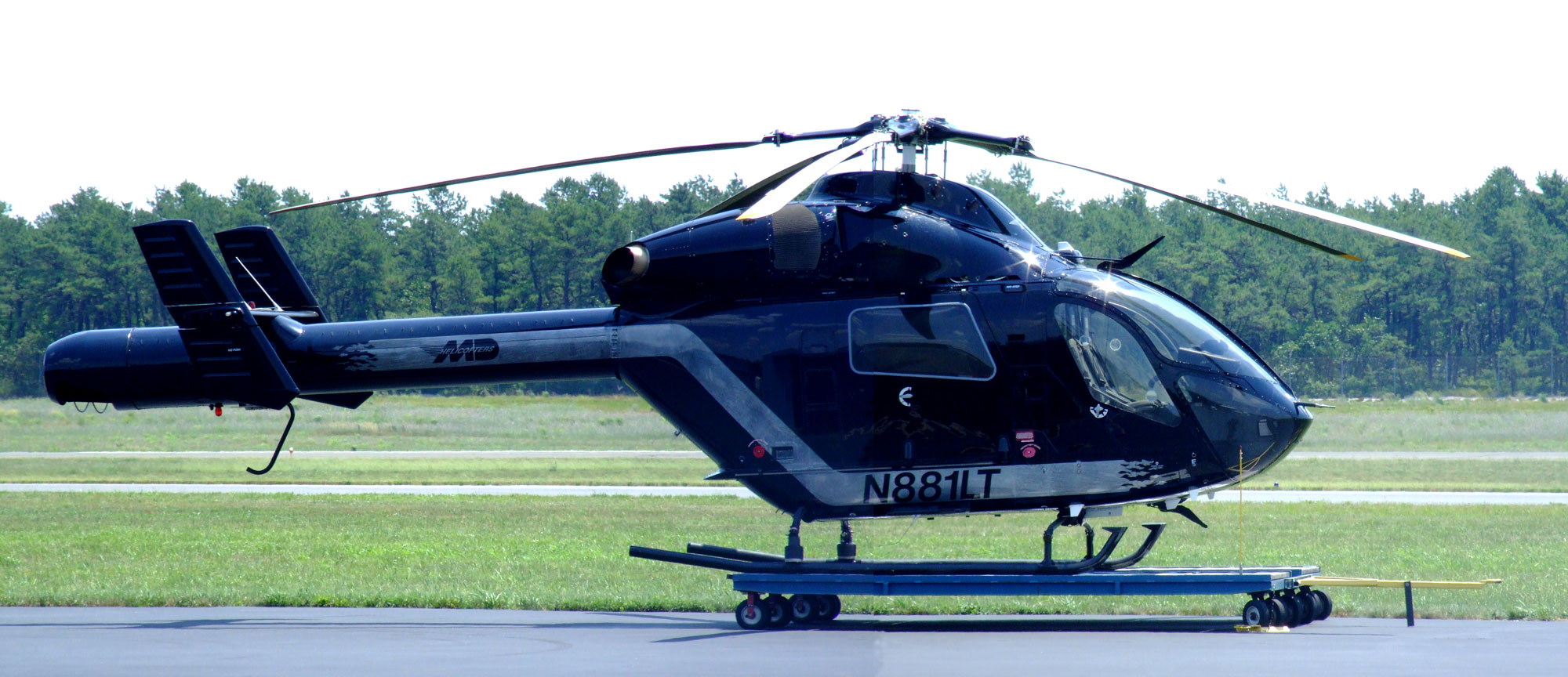
MD 900

== Applications ==
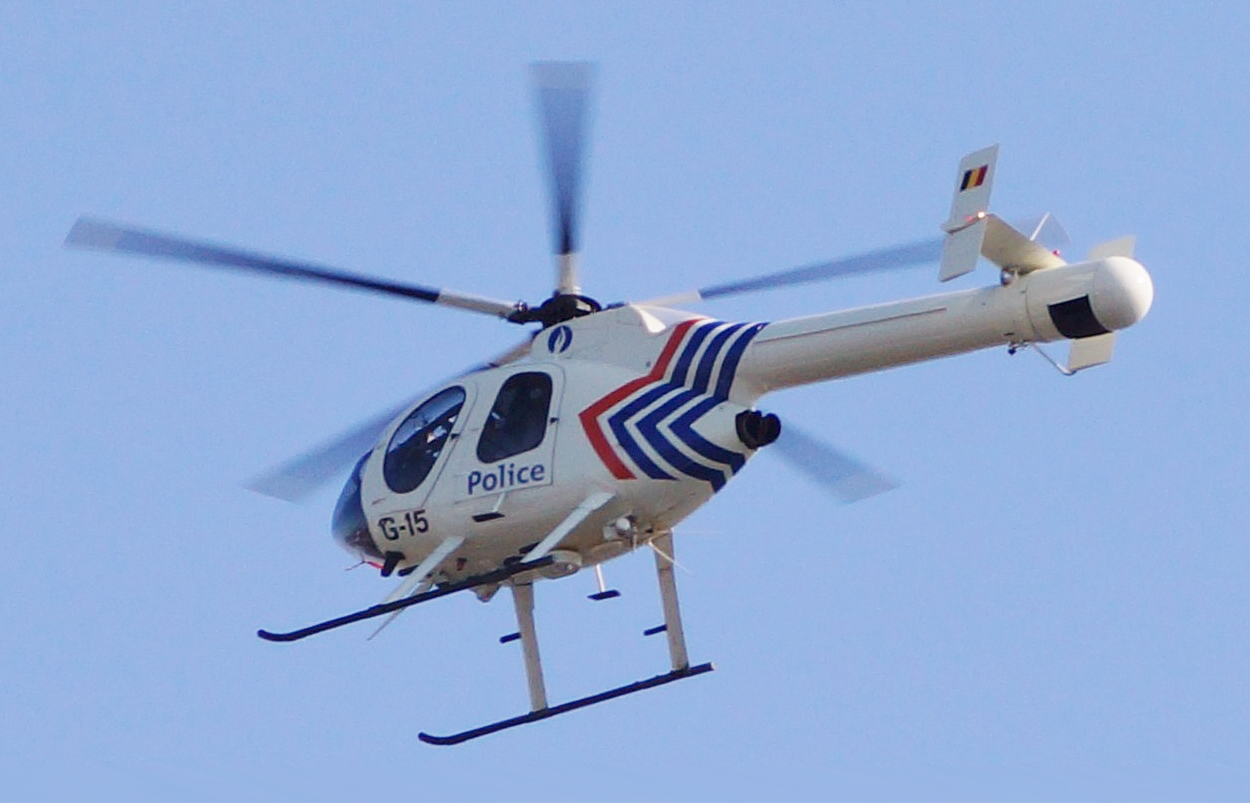
MD Helicopters 520N NOTAR

There are several production helicopters that utilize the NOTAR system, which are produced by MD Helicopters:

- MD 530N: a 2025 NOTAR variant of the Hughes/MD500 series helicopter powered by the Rolls-Royce C30 engine
- MD 520N: a NOTAR variant of the Hughes/MD500 series helicopter
- MD 600N: a larger version of the MD 520N
- MD Explorer: a twin-engine, eight-seat light helicopter

== See also ==
- Coaxial rotors
- Fenestron
- Intermeshing rotors (synchropter)
- Tandem rotors
- Transverse rotors
- Multirotors
- Quadrotors
- Tiltrotors
- Tip jet rotor
- Youngcopter Neo
