= Museum of Aeronautics and Astronautics (Madrid) =

Aviation museum in Madrid, Spain

Coordinates: 40.365945°N 3.803833°W

- Museo de Aeronáutica y Astronáutica
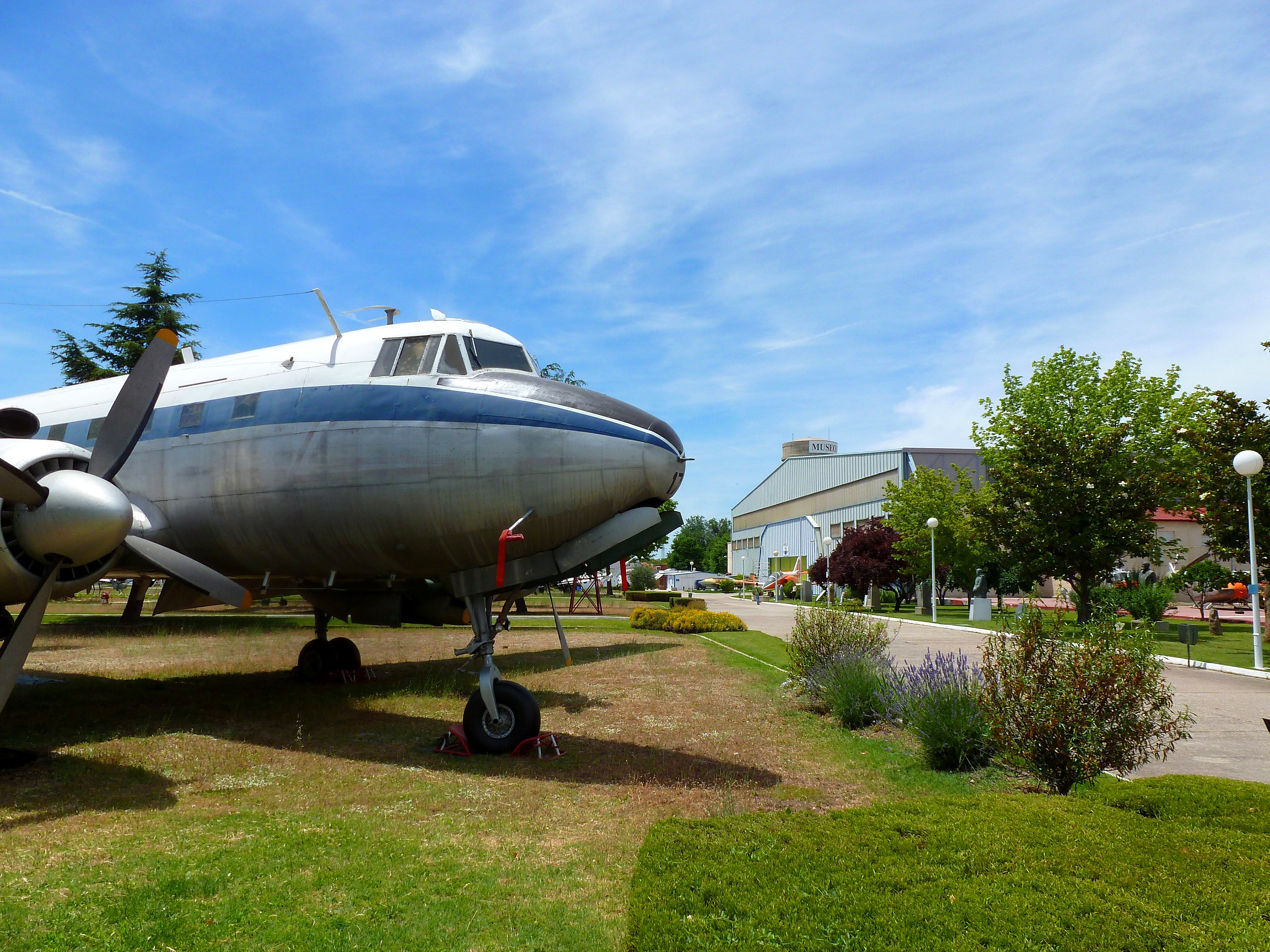
- Former name: Museo del Aire
- Established: 16 June 1966
- Location: Madrid
- Type: Aviation museum
- Owner: Spanish Air and Space Force
- Public transit access: Cuatro Vientos; Cuatro Vientos
- Website: Official website

Museum of Aeronautics and Astronautics (Spanish: Museo de Aeronáutica y Astronáutica), also known as Air Museum (Museo del Aire), is an aviation museum located at the Cuatro Vientos Air Base in Madrid, Spain, devoted to the history of the Spanish Air and Space Force. It is one of the National Museums of Spain and it is attached to the Ministry of Defence.

The objective of the museum is to acquire, conserve and display the aircraft, equipment and associated paraphernalia that constitute the historical heritage of the Spanish Air and Space Force. It has an exterior exhibition and seven hangars.

== History ==
In 1939 the Spanish Civil War came to an end and the Spanish Air Force was created. It is in this period the Ministry of the Air (Ministerio del Aire) appointed Colonel Társilo Ugarte Fernández to prepare a project for the creation of an aeronautic museum. However, 27 years passed before its creation. A first draft was presented in December 1948, with its location in the plant below the new building of the Ministry of the Air.

Through subsequent studies and consults, the Museum of Aeronautics and Astronautics was created by decree number 1437 of June 16, 1966, accountable to the Ministry of the Air and with headquarters in Madrid.

Since 1975, the museum has been based at Cuatro Vientos near of Madrid, however the works itself started at the end of 1979. Thereafter, it has been extended many times. Cuatro Vientos, was inaugurated in 1911 and is Spain's first military airfield. The airfield, although surrounded by construction, is still in use. The museum was officially inaugurated on 24 May 1981, by Lieutenant-General Emiliano Alfaro Jose Arregui.

In 1993, two new hangars were added, and even two more in 2002. Among these hangars, there is number 4, which was inaugurated on 22 August 2003, and which is dedicated to rotating wings and other autogyros, machines whose origins came directly from the Spanish engineer Juan De La Cierva.

== Museum Displays ==
The museum facilities extend over a surface of more than 66,938 m^{2} (720,510 sq ft), including outdoor displays, about 200 aircraft and seven hangars. There are mainly planes and helicopters, many of which have previously served in the Spanish Air and Space Force. Visitors will also find hundreds of miniature aircraft models, engines, weapons, uniforms, vehicles, mock-ups and many other aviation related objects. Aircraft on display include a Vilanova Acedo, Spanish version of the Blériot XI built in 1911, the Jesús del Gran Poder, a special version of the Breguet 19 used on the transatlantic flight to Asia and America between 1928 and 1929, a few aircraft of the Spanish Republican Air Force, as well as the famous de Havilland Dragon Rapide used by Francisco Franco from the Canary Islands to Tétouan at the start of the military rebellion which began the Spanish Civil War in 1936.

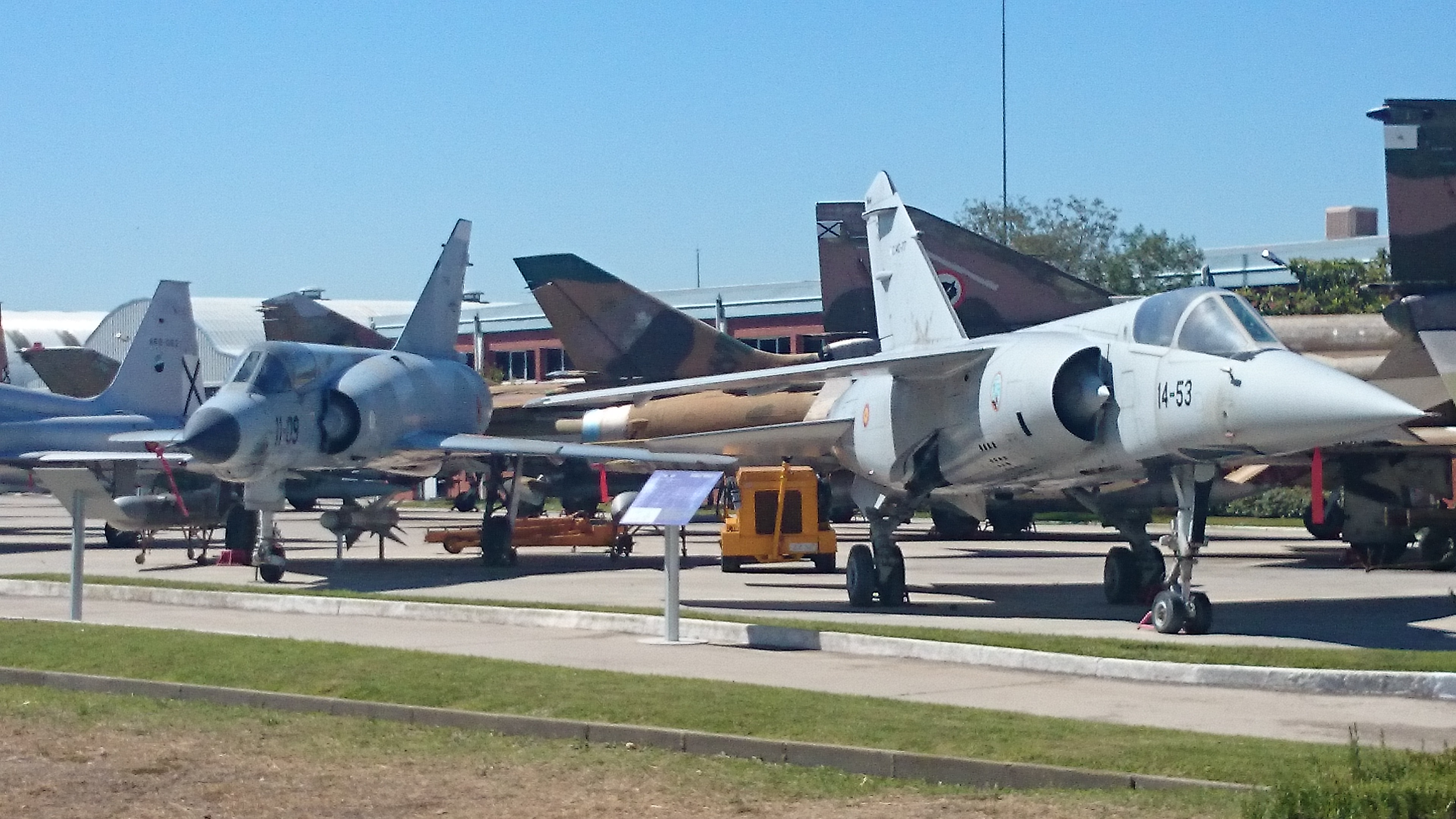
Ex Spanish Airforce Mirage F-1 and Mirage III

=== Outdoor exhibition area ===
The Spanish versions of the Heinkel He 111 and the Junkers Ju 52, fighters as McDonnell Douglas F-4C Phantom II or Mirage F-1, one Canadair Cl-215, Aerospatiale AS-330 Puma or even a MiG-17.

=== Hangar expositions ===
- Hangar 1: Beginnings of the history of aviation in Spain, aviation during the Rif War, Spanish aviation in the pioneer era and aircraft during Spanish Civil War.
- Hangar 2: Engines, simulators, aeronautical equipment and uniforms.
- Hangar 3: Training planes, fighters of the Spanish war, post-war fighters, gliders and a collection of propellers and engines.
- Hangar 4: Helicopters and autogyros with, among others, two La Cierva, or the Aerotécnica AC-12 and AC-14, and collection of flight instruments.
- Hangar 5: Spanish Air Force aircraft, like the General Franco's de Havilland Dragon Rapide, two versions of the local jet Hispano HA-200.
- Hangar 6: Dedicated mainly to restoration.
- Hangar 7: A collection of more than 100 models on a 1:10 scale

== Aircraft exhibits ==
=== List of selected aircraft on display ===
Designation	Displayed identity	Notes	Image
Aerotécnica AC-12	Z.2–6		commons
Aerotécnica AC-14	Z.4-06		commons
Boeing KC-97G	TK.1-03	'123-03'	
Bolkow Bo.105LOH	HR.15–21	'ET-140'	commons
Breguet 19GR	-	'Cuatro Vientos'	commons
Breguet 19TR Bidon	72	'Jesus del Gran Poder'	commons
Bristol F.2B	B21		
CASA 2.111E (Heinkel 111H)	T.8B-97	'462-04'	
CASA 352L (Junkers Ju 52)	T.2B-211	'911-16'	commons
CASA C-101 Aviojet	XE.25-01		commons
CASA C-207 Azor	T.7-6	'405-15'	commons
CASA C-212 Aviocar	XT.12-1	'54-10'	commons
Caudron G.3	BC-6		commons
Cierva C.6	C.6-B		commons
Cierva C.19	EC-AIM		commons
Cierva C.30A	XVU.1-1		
Consolidated PBY-5A Catalina	DR.1-1		
de Havilland Dragon Rapide	G-ACYR	Aircraft carried General Francisco Franco in July 1936 to Spanish Morocco at the beginning of the Spanish Civil War.	commons
de Havilland Canada DHC-4 Caribou	T.9–25		commons
Dornier Do 24T-3	HD.5-2	'58-2'	commons
Douglas C-47 Dakota	T.3–36	'721-9'	
Farman F.402	SF-002		commons
Fieseler Fi 156 Storch	L.16–23		commons
Grumman HU-16B	AD.1B-8		
Heinkel He 111E-3	B.2–82	'25–82'	
Hispano HS-34	EC-AFJ		
Hispano HA-1112K1L Tripala	C.4J-2		commons
Hispano HA-1112M1L Buchon	C.4K-158		commons
Hispano HA-200 Saeta	A.10C-104		commons
Lockheed F-104G Starfighter	C.8–15	'104-15'	commons
McDonnell F-4C Phantom II	C.12–37	'12–29'	commons
Mikoyan-Gurevich MiG-17	42		commons
Mikoyan-Gurevich MiG-21	22–26	E German AF	commons
Mil Mi-2	CCCP-23760	Icona '34'	commons
Nieuport IV	M.N.N.5		
North American T-6G	E.16–90	'793-6'	commons
North American B-25J Mitchell	130338	'74-17'	
North American F-86 Sabre	C.5-175	'1–175'	commons
Polikarpov I-15	CA-125		commons
Slingsby T.34 Sky	EC-RAT		
Transavia PL-12 Airtruk	VH-TRQ		commons
Vilanova Acedo (Blériot XI)	-		commons
Westland Whirlwind 2	ZD.1B-22	'803-4'	commons

== Gallery ==
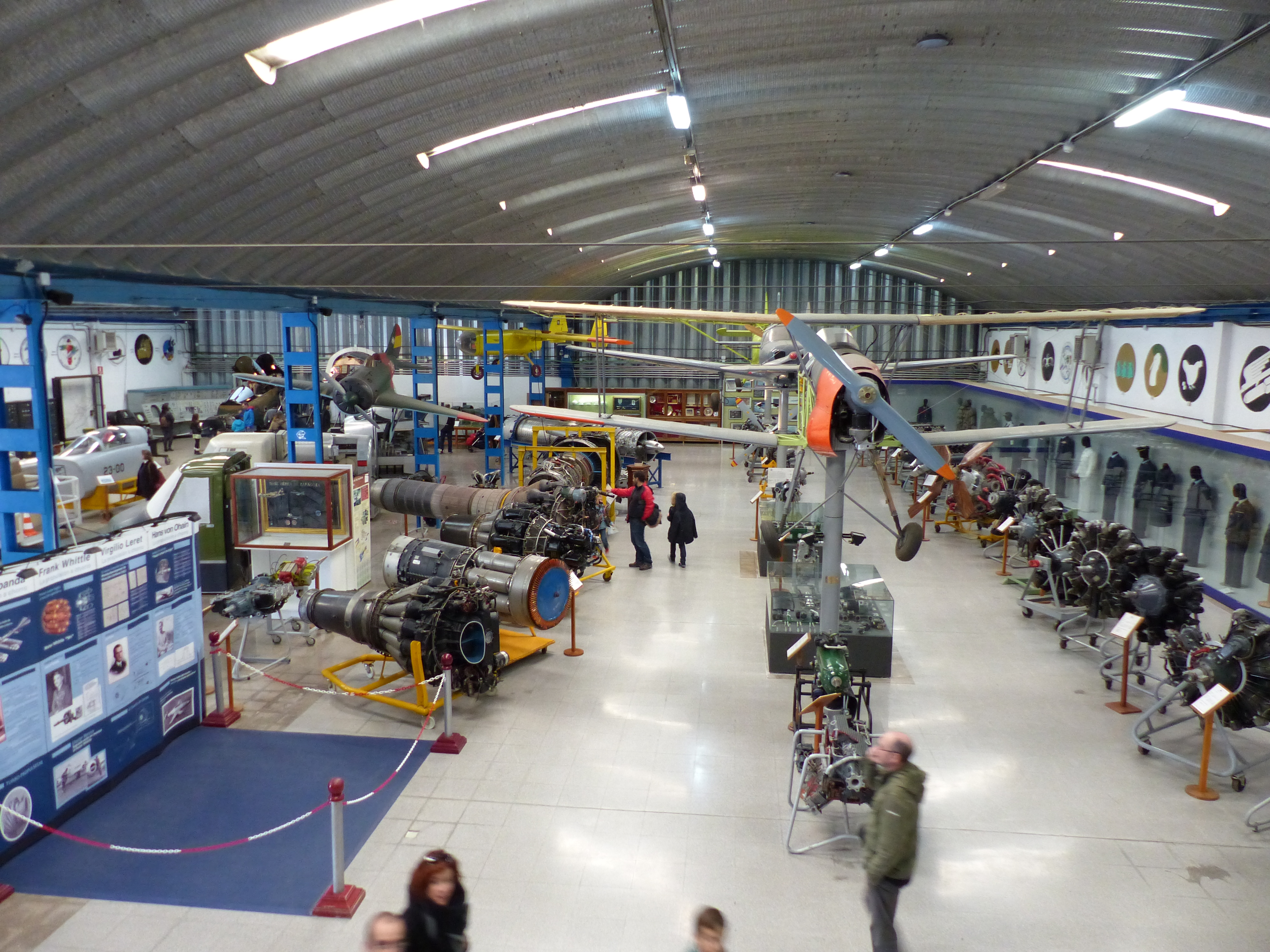
Hangar 2

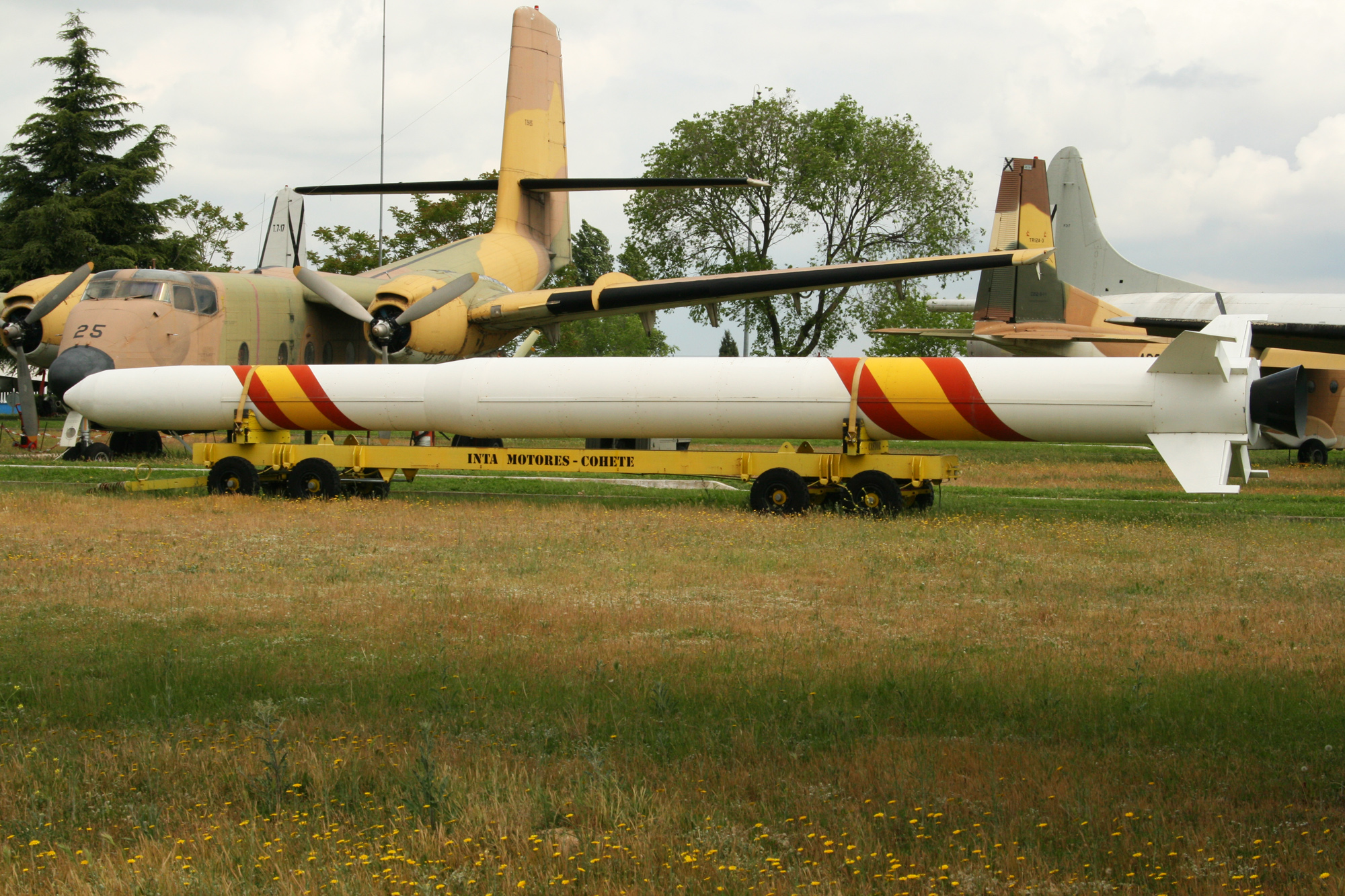
Rocket Capricornio, Spanish satellite launch vehicle.

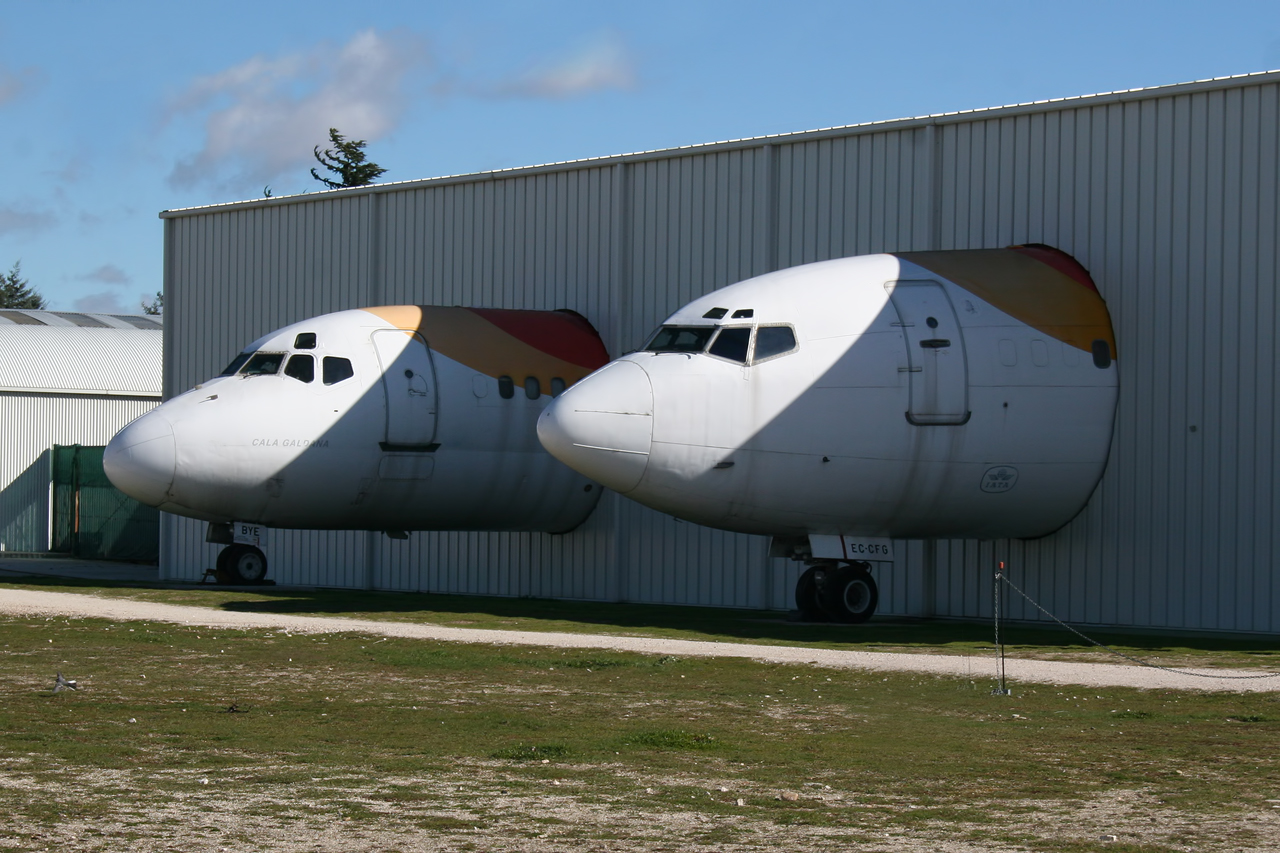
Cabins from Douglas DC-9 and Boing 727

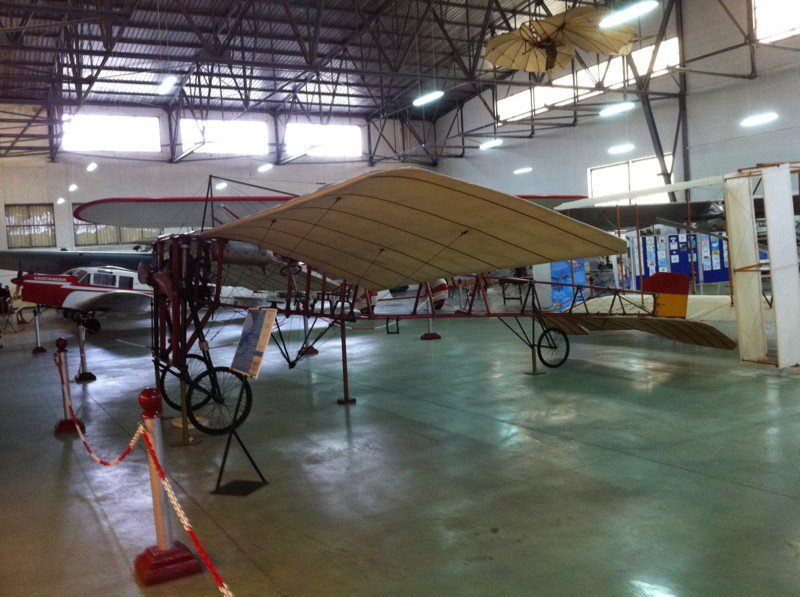
The Vilanova Acedo built in 1911, is the oldest aircraft preserved in Spain.

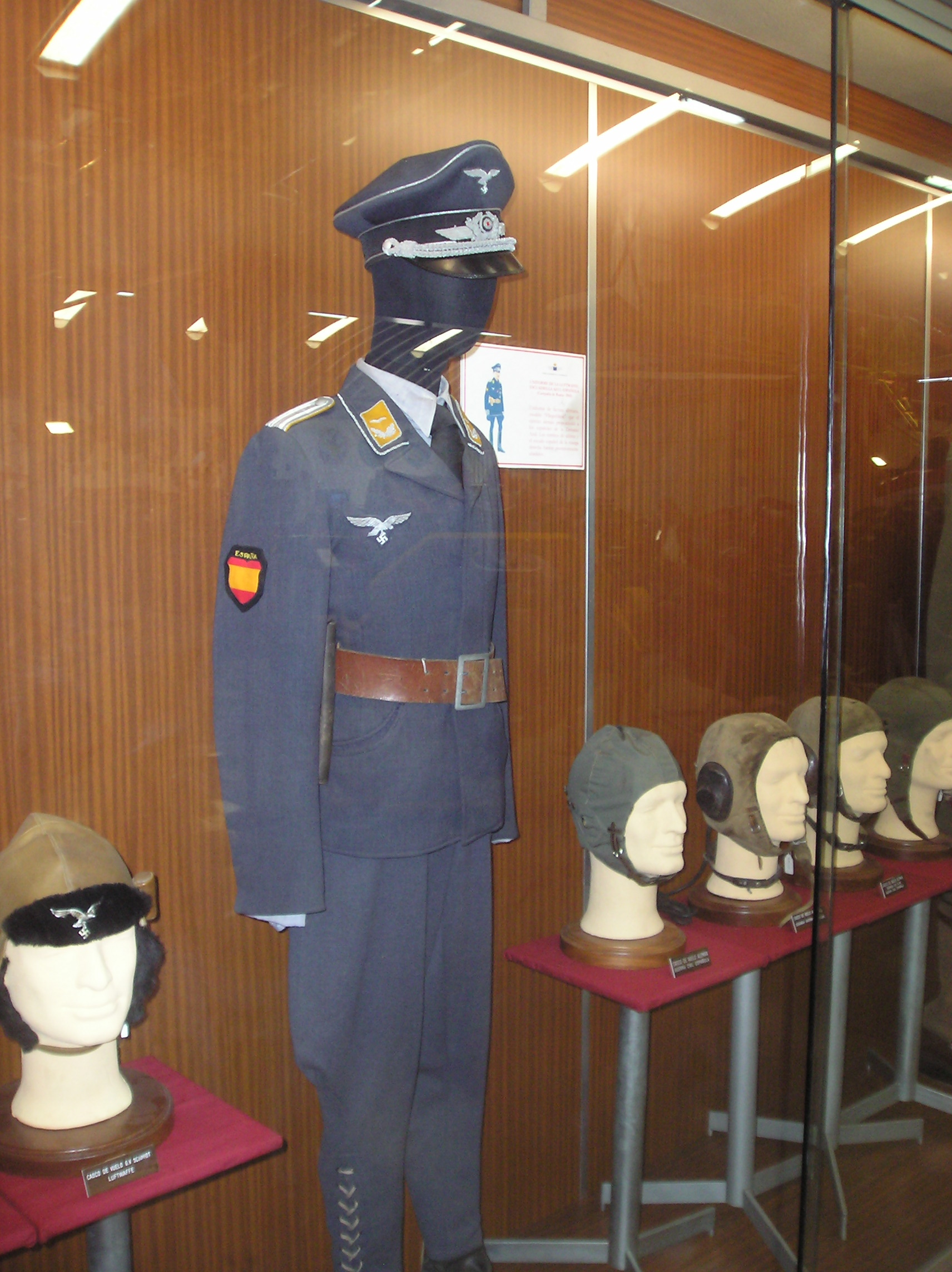
Uniform from Escuadrilla Azul

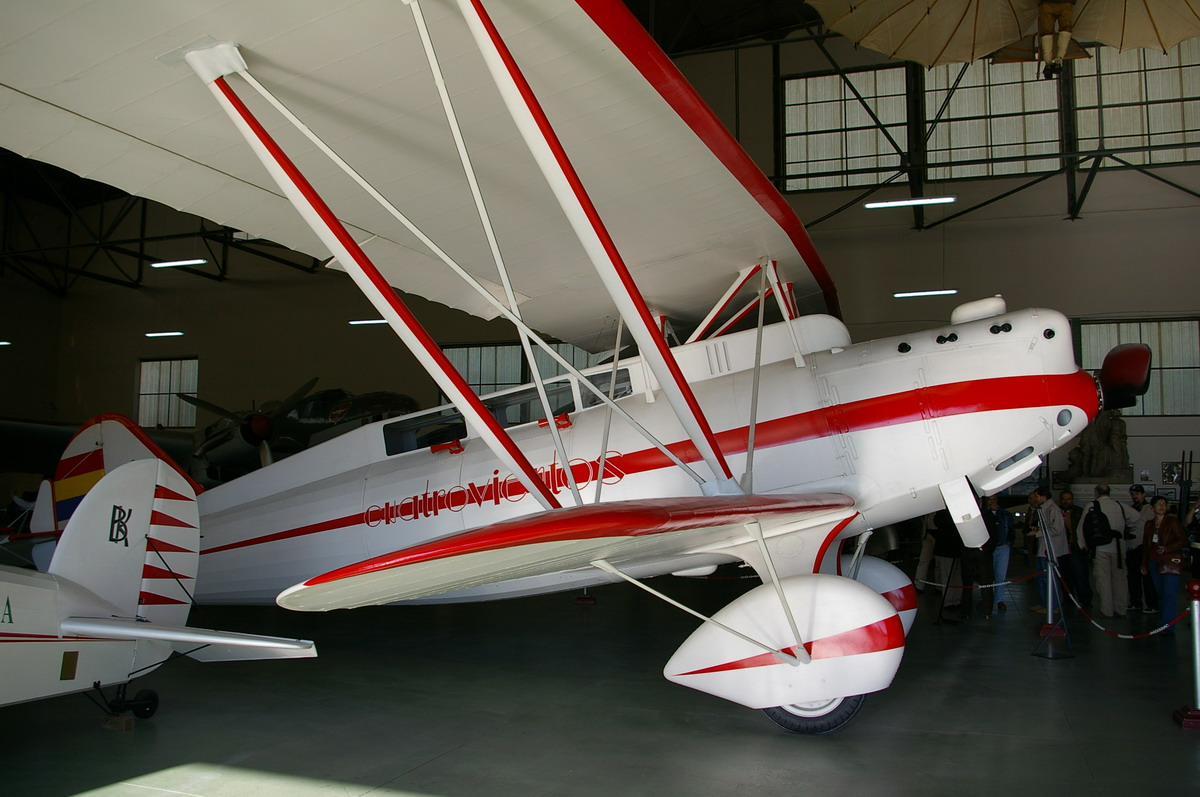
Cuatro Vientos (replica); this aircraft flew in 1933 from Spain to Cuba.

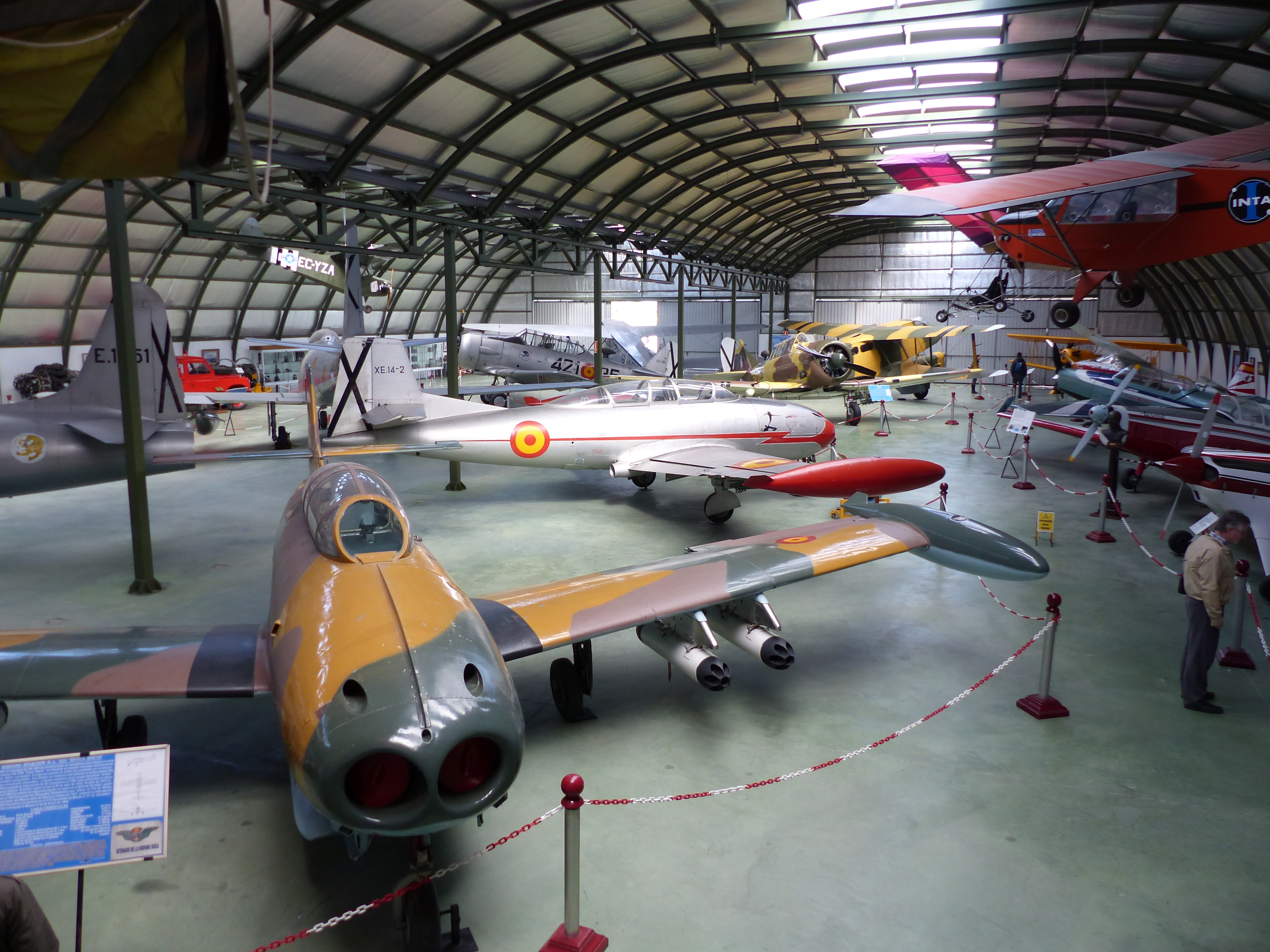
Hangar 5

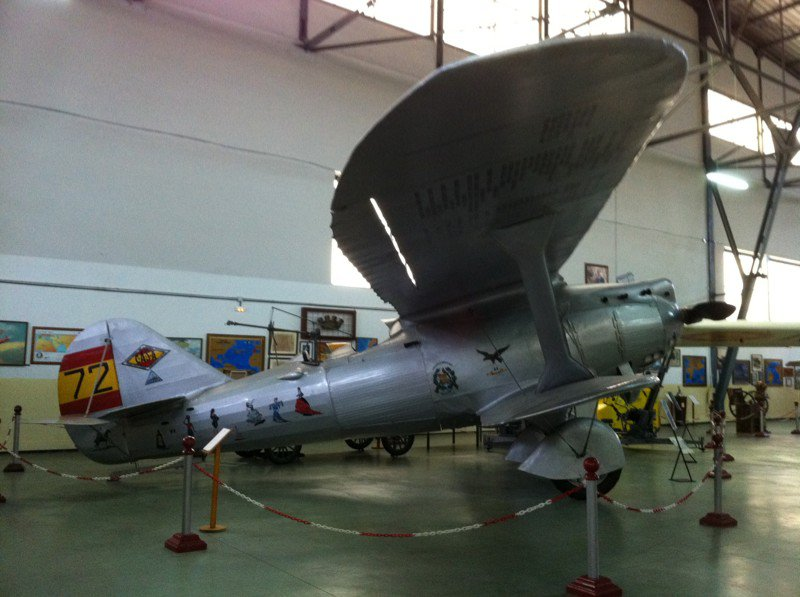
Jesús del Gran Poder, historical Spanish aircraft.

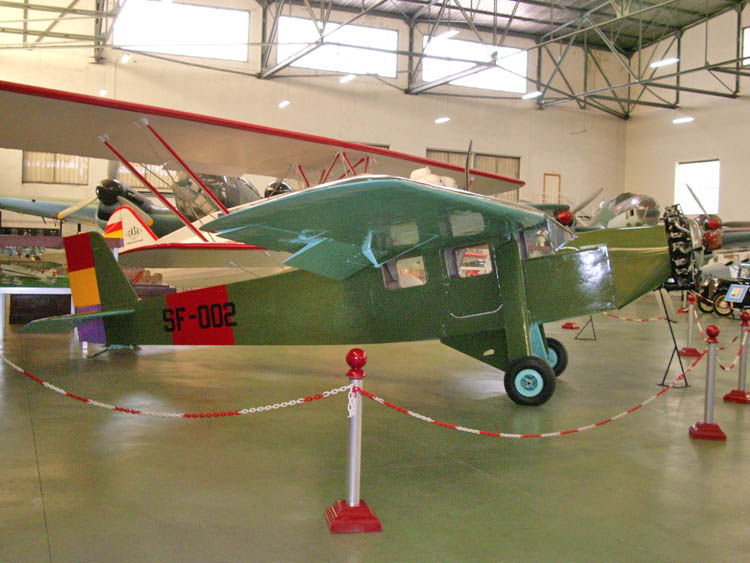
Farman F.402 of the Spanish Republican Air Force.

== See also ==
- List of aircraft of the Spanish Air and Space Force
- List of aerospace museums

== Bibliography ==
- Guía del Museo de Aeronáutica y Astronáutica (in Spanish). Madrid: Ministry of Defence (Spain). 2014. ISBN 9788497818810.
- Ogden, Bob. (2009). Aviation Museums and Collections of Mainland Europe. Air-Britain (Historians) Ltd ISBN 0-85130-375-7
