= Nord Norelfe =

French helicopter built by Nord Aviation

Norelfe

General information
- Type: Three-seat experimental helicopter
- National origin: France
- Manufacturer: Nord Aviation
- Designer: Jean Cantinieau
- Number built: 2

History
- First flight: 28 December 1954

The Nord 1750 Norelfe was a 1950s French three-seat helicopter built by Nord Aviation and designed by Jean Cantinieau.

== Development ==
The 1750 Norelfe was based on the Matra-Cantinieau MC-101A, an earlier helicopter designed by Jean Cantinieau. It had a single main rotor, with torque control through a movable duct at the end of the tailboom. Powered by a Turbomeca Artouste turboshaft, the first of two Norelfes flew on 28 December 1954.

The company sold the two helicopters and the design rights to Aerotécnica of Spain who redesignated them the Aerotécnica AC-13A. Aerotécnica went on to produce a larger five-seat version, the Aerotécnica AC-14 which was used by the Ejército del Aire (Spanish Air Force).

== Specifications (AC-13A) ==
Data from Jane's All the World's Aircraft 1958-59

General characteristics

- Crew: 1
- Capacity: 2 pax
- Length: 7.48 m (24 ft 6 in)
- Height: 2.75 m (9 ft 0 in) to top of rotor pylon
- Empty weight: 575 kg (1,268 lb)
- Gross weight: 880 kg (1,940 lb)
- Fuel capacity: 115 L (30 US gal; 25 imp gal)
- Powerplant: 1 × Turbomeca Artouste I turboshaft, 130 kW (170 hp) at transmission (rated to 260 shp (194 kW))
- Main rotor diameter: 9.04 m (29 ft 8 in)
- Main rotor area: 64 m^{2} (690 sq ft)

Performance

- Maximum speed: 140 km/h (87 mph, 76 kn)
- Cruise speed: 124 km/h (77 mph, 67 kn)
- Range: 140–345 km (87–214 mi, 76–186 nmi)
- Service ceiling: 6,065 m (19,898 ft)
- Hover ceiling IGE: 2,650 m (8,694 ft)
- Rate of climb: 4.6 m/s (910 ft/min)

== See also ==
Related development

- Aerotécnica AC-14

Related lists

- List of rotorcraft
