= AC-12 =

AC-12 may refer to:

== Vehicles ==
- Southern Pacific class AC-12, a 1940s American steam locomotive class
- Comte AC-12 Moskito, a 1930s Swiss monoplane
- Aerotécnica AC-12, a 1950s Spanish helicopter

== Other uses ==
- AC-12, an IEC utilization category in electrical engineering
- AC-12, a fictional police anti-corruption unit in Line of Duty, a British television series
