= Youngcopter Neo =

German helicopter

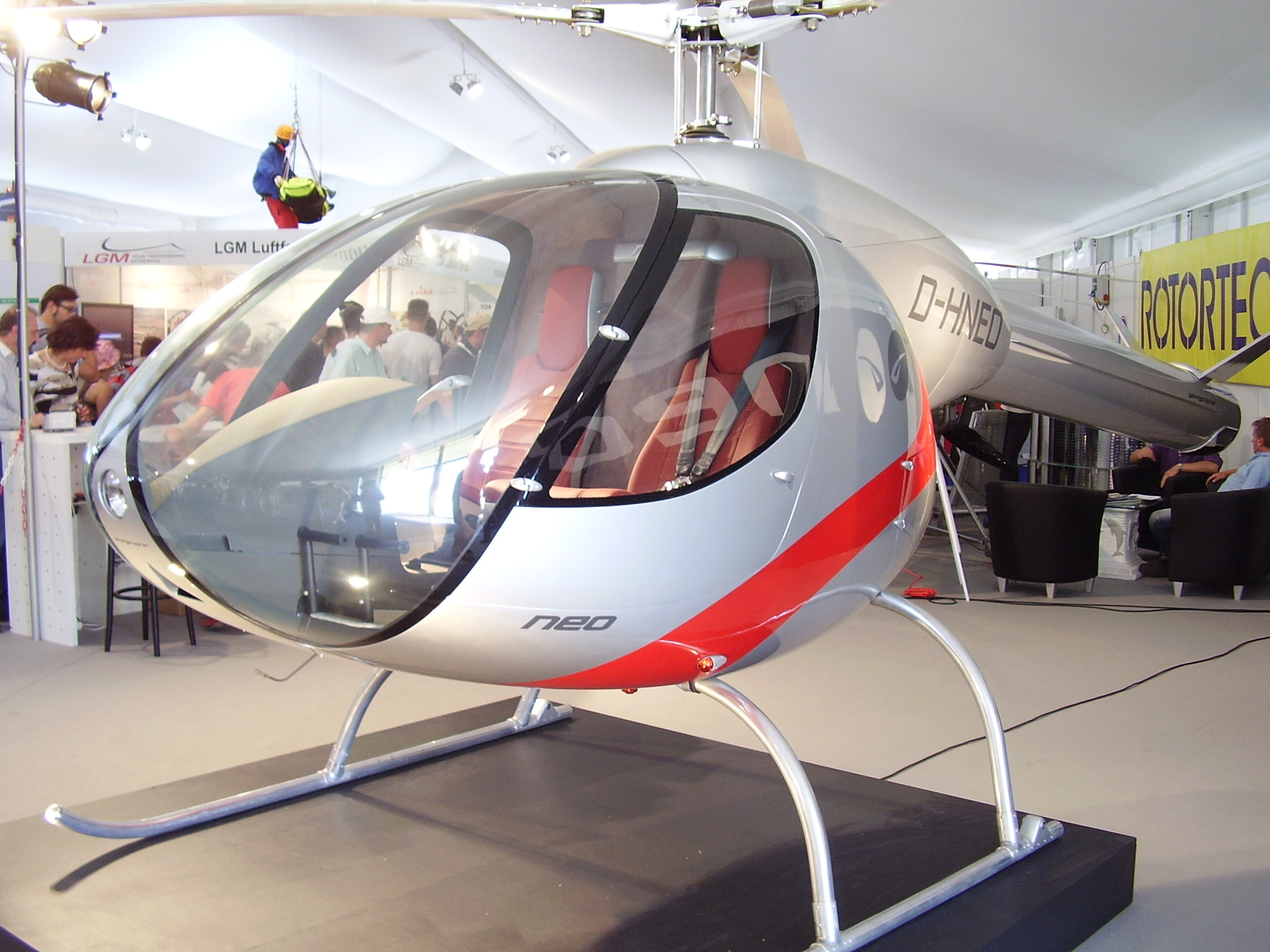

General information
- Type: Helicopter
- National origin: Germany
- Manufacturer: Youngcopter
- Designer: Björn Jung
- Status: Under development (2018)
- Number built: one prototype

History
- Introduction date: 2008
- First flight: 31 October 2011

The Youngcopter Neo (transl. New) is a German NOTAR helicopter that was designed by Björn Jung and is under development by his company, Youngcopter of Mainz. It was first publicly introduced at the ILA Berlin Air Show in 2008. The aircraft is intended to be supplied as a kit for amateur construction.

No projected date has been announced for kit deliveries and no pricing has been set as of January 2018.

== Design and development ==
The Neo was designed to comply with the amateur-built aircraft construction rules. The first prototype was completed in 2008 and ground run. By 2010 ground testing had been completed, including rotor system tracking and balancing. The prototype first flew in hovering flight on 31 October 2011 and developmental hover flight testing continued through 2015.

The Neo design features a single main rotor, with no tail rotor, a two-seats-in side-by-side configuration enclosed cockpit with a windshield, skid landing gear and a twin-rotor 180 hp (134 kW) Neosis Wankel engine.

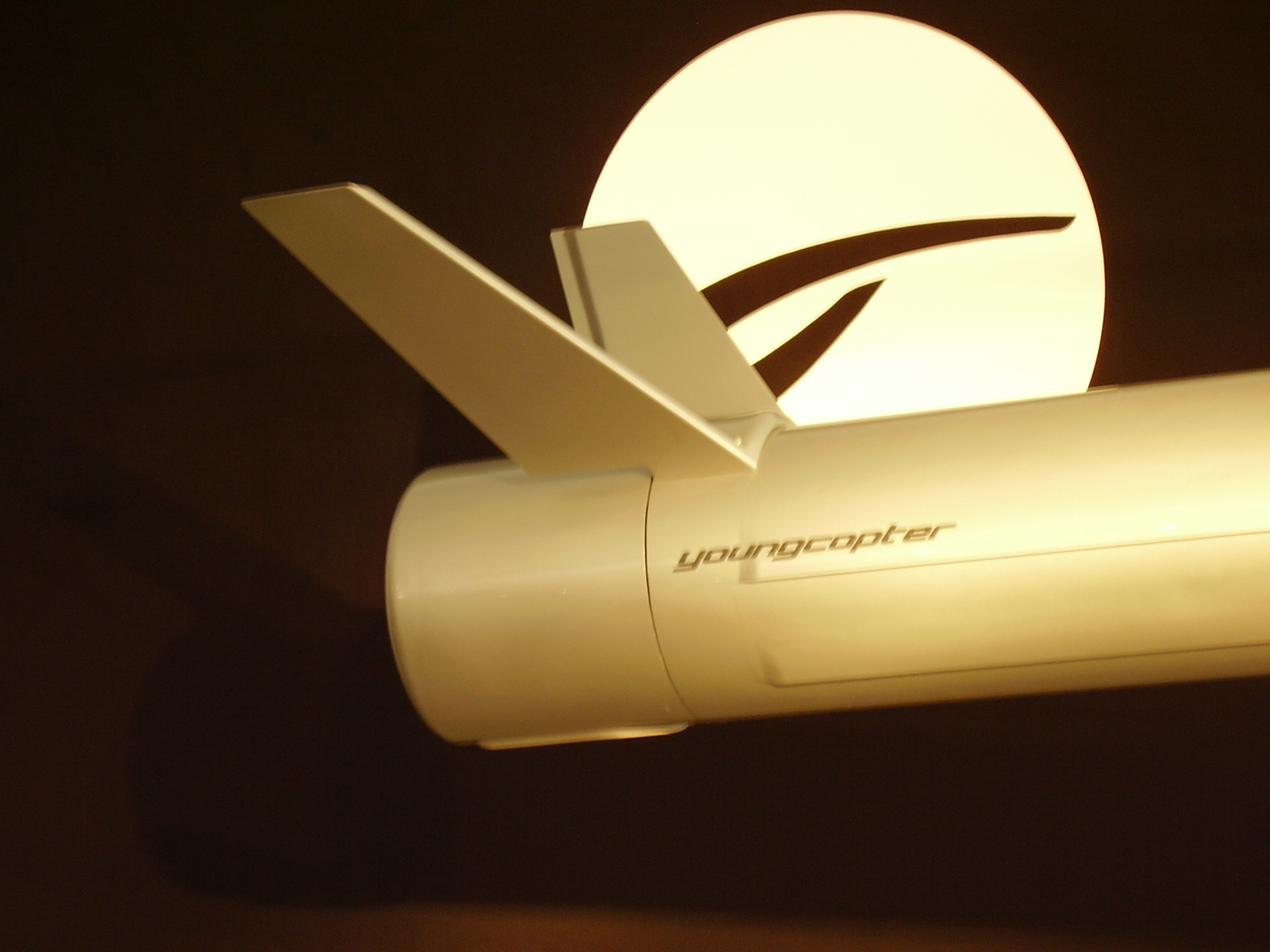
Youngcopter Neo tail boom design

The aircraft fuselage is composite material monocoque design. Its three-bladed rotor has a diameter of 7.7 m (25.3 ft) and can be folded for hangar storage. The aircraft has a typical empty weight of 385 kg (849 lb) and a gross weight of 640 kg (1,411 lb), giving a useful load of 255 kg (562 lb). With full fuel of 120 litres (26 imp gal; 32 US gal) the payload for the pilot, passenger and baggage is 168 kg (370 lb).

The Neo kit under development is intended to be constructed by a person with average mechanical skills. It will not require any welding or composite materials lamination work. The proposed kit will include all sub-assemblies, engine and instruments.

== Specifications (Neo) ==
Data from Tacke and manufacturfer

General characteristics

- Crew: one
- Capacity: one passenger
- Length: 6.230 m (20 ft 5 in)
- Width: 1.930 m (6 ft 4 in)
- Height: 2.450 m (8 ft 0 in)
- Empty weight: 385 kg (849 lb)
- Gross weight: 640 kg (1,411 lb)
- Fuel capacity: 120 litres (26 imp gal; 32 US gal)
- Powerplant: 1 × Neosis twin-rotor, Wankel engine, 130 kW (180 hp)
- Main rotor diameter: 7.7 m (25 ft 3 in)
- Main rotor area: 46.5 m^{2} (501 sq ft)

Performance

- Maximum speed: 220 km/h (140 mph, 120 kn)
- Cruise speed: 185 km/h (115 mph, 100 kn)
- Range: 560 km (350 mi, 300 nmi)
- Disk loading: 13.8 kg/m^{2} (2.8 lb/sq ft)

== See also ==
- List of rotorcraft
- eVTOL
- Flying car
- Electric aircraft
- Urban air mobility
- Air taxi
