= Aerotécnica =

Spanish aircraft manufacturer

Aerotécnica was a Spanish aircraft manufacturer established in Madrid in 1954 to develop Jean Cantinieau's helicopter designs. After manufacturing small numbers of the AC-12 and AC-14, the firm ceased trading in 1962, as a consequence of lower cost for Spanish Air Force of US Helicopters, surplus of Korea War.

== Aircraft ==
- Aerotécnica AC-11
- Aerotécnica AC-12
- Aerotécnica AC-13
- Aerotécnica AC-14
- Aerotécnica AC-15
- Aerotécnica AC-21
