= Aerotécnica AC-14 =

AC-14
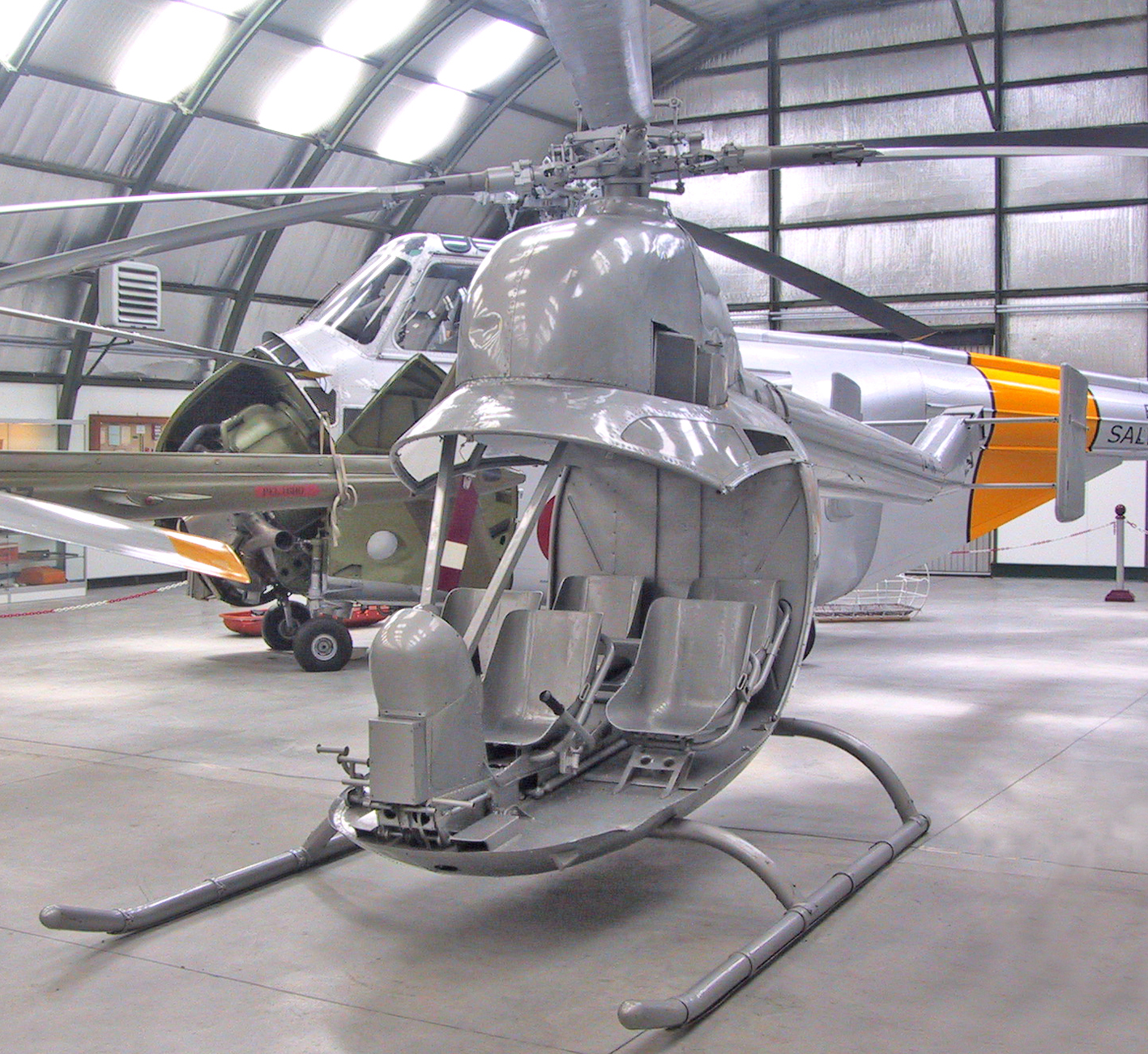

General information
- Type: light utility helicopter
- National origin: Spain
- Manufacturer: Aerotécnica
- Designer: Jean Cantinieau
- Number built: 11

History
- First flight: 16 July 1957

The Aerotécnica AC-14 was a Spanish five-seat light helicopter of the 1950s, designed by Jean Cantinieau, based on enlarging his Nord Norelfe design.

The AC-14 continued the Cantinieau practice of mounting the engine forward of the main rotor, and like the Norelfe, used the ducted exhaust from the turboshaft to counter the torque of the main rotor at low speeds, while at high speeds the exhaust gases were deflected rearwards to increase speed, torque being compensated for by movable twin tail fins.

The first of prototype flew on 16 July 1957. The Spanish Air Force placed a pre-production order for ten machines where they served for a short time under the designation EC-XZ-4. No full production ensued, as they were much more expensive than second-hand Bell 47G-2 and G-3s.

== Operators ==
- Spain
  - Spanish Air Force - Ten pre-production aircraft only.

== Specifications ==
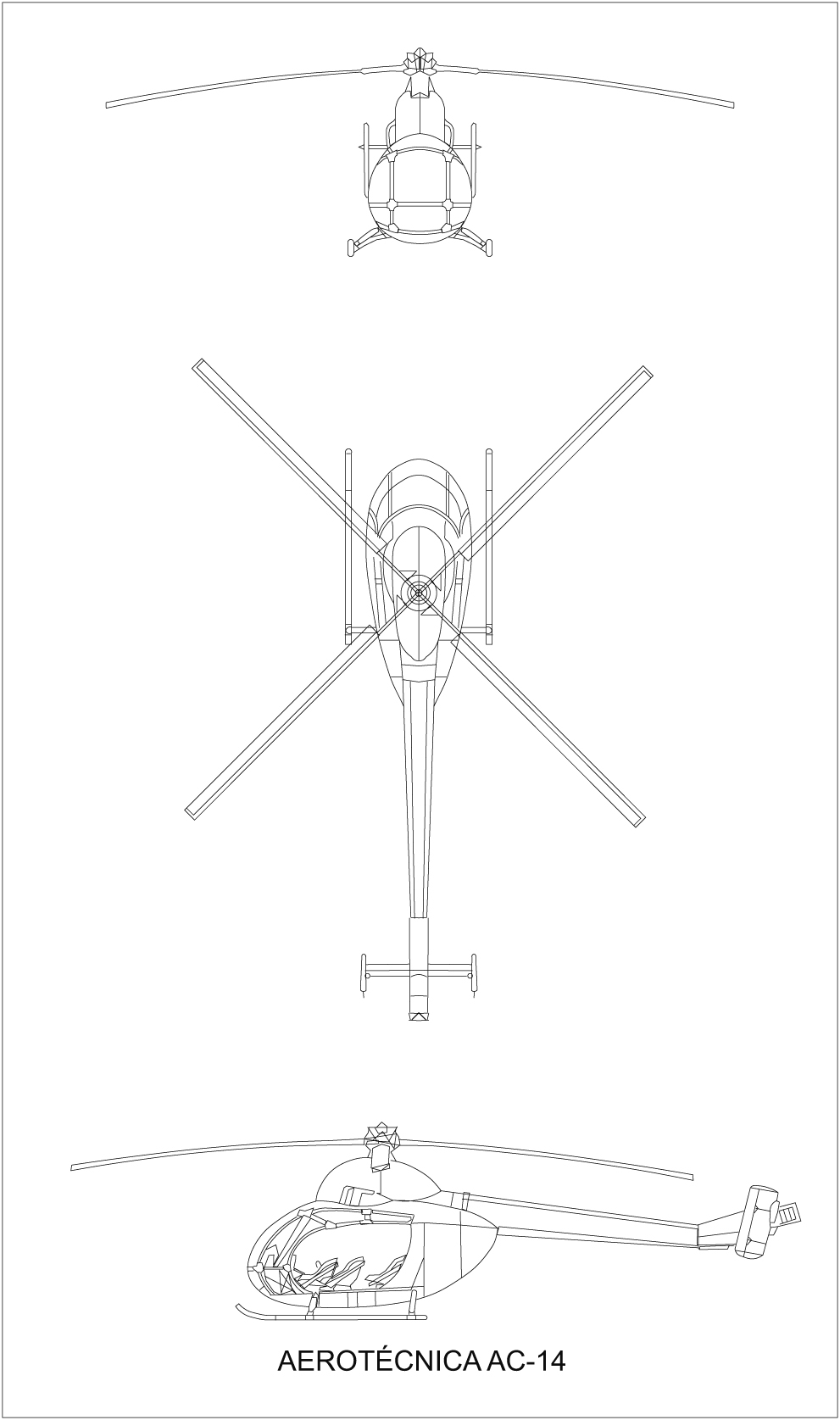
Aerotécnica AC-14 outline

Data from Janes' All The World's Aircraft 1961–62

General characteristics

- Crew: 1
- Capacity: 4 passengers
- Length: 8.13 m (26 ft 8 in)
- Height: 3.10 m (10 ft 2 in)
- Empty weight: 650 kg (1,433 lb)
- Gross weight: 1,250 kg (2,756 lb)
- Max takeoff weight: 1,350 kg (2,976 lb)
- Powerplant: 1 × Turbomeca Artouste IIB turboshaft engine, 300 kW (400 hp)
- Main rotor diameter: 9.65 m (31 ft 8 in)
- Main rotor area: 72.35 m^{2} (778.8 sq ft)

Performance

- Maximum speed: 180 km/h (110 mph, 97 kn)
- Cruise speed: 150 km/h (93 mph, 81 kn)
- Range: 300 km (190 mi, 160 nmi)
- Ferry range: 640 km (400 mi, 350 nmi) (with auxiliary tanks)
- Service ceiling: 6,800 m (22,300 ft)
- Rate of climb: 4.62 m/s (909 ft/min)
Aerotécnica AC-14
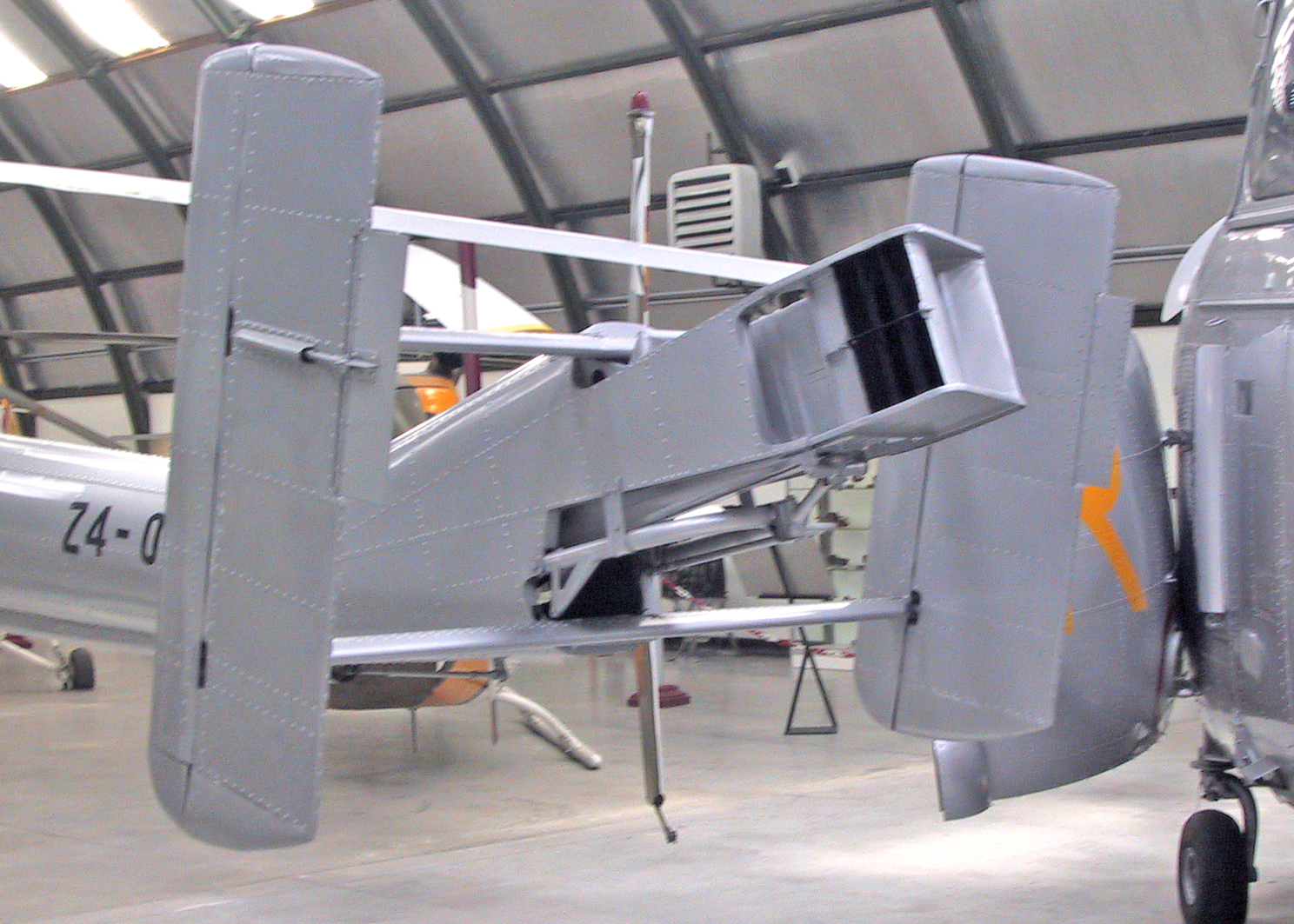
Aerotécnica AC-14, Ducted exhaust and rudders detail

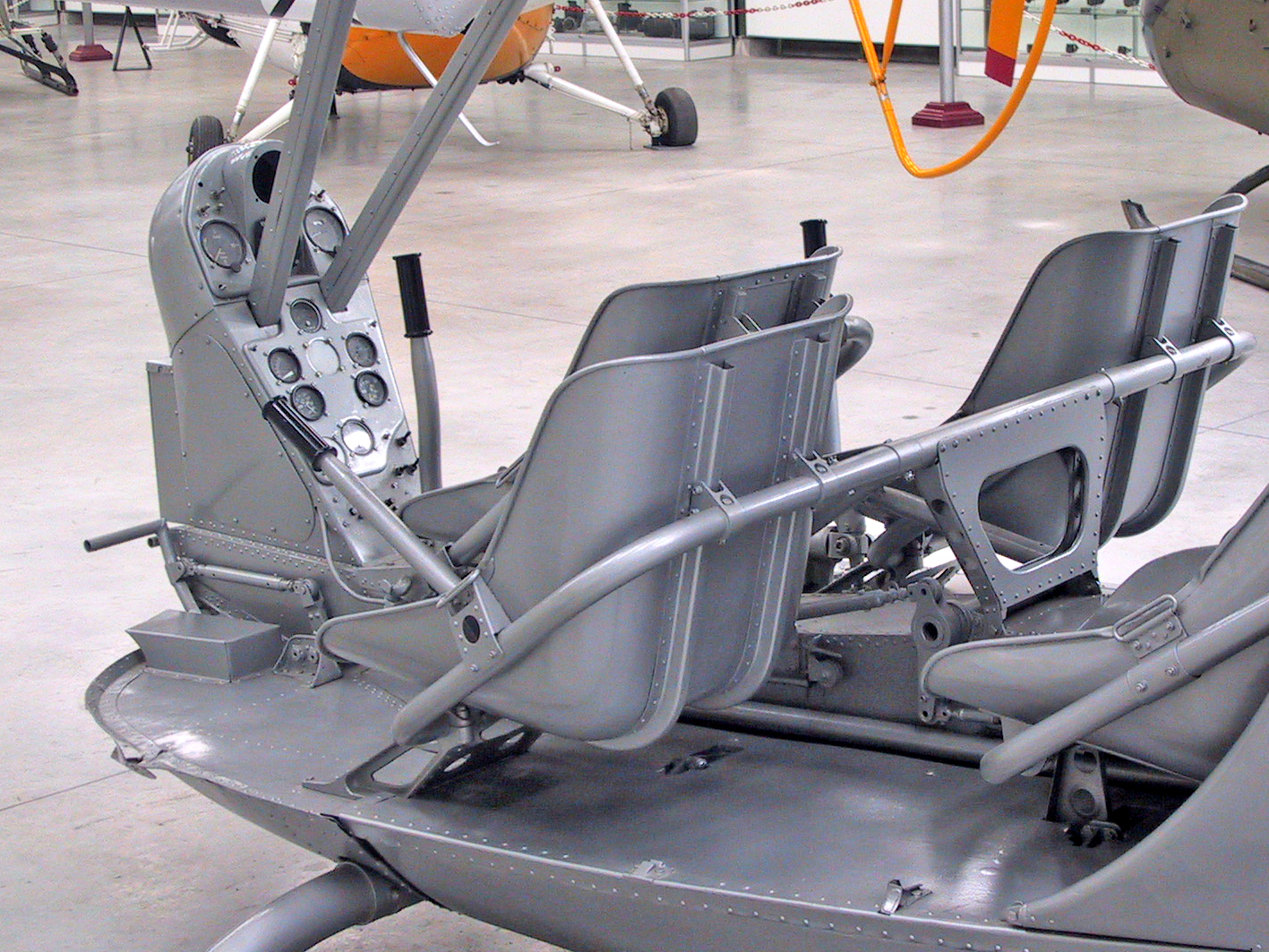
Aerotécnica AC-14, Cockpit detail

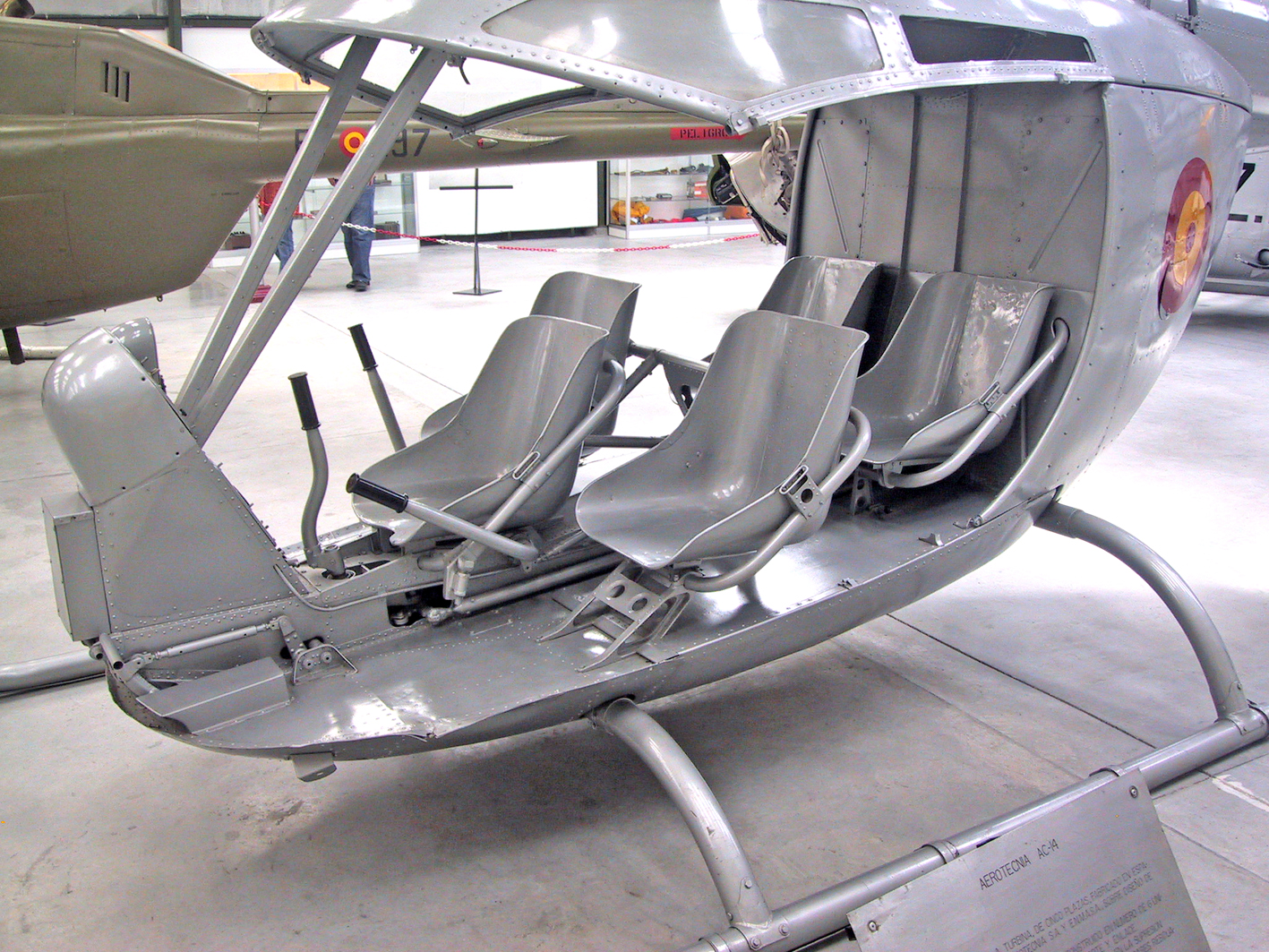
Aerotécnica AC-14, Seats detail

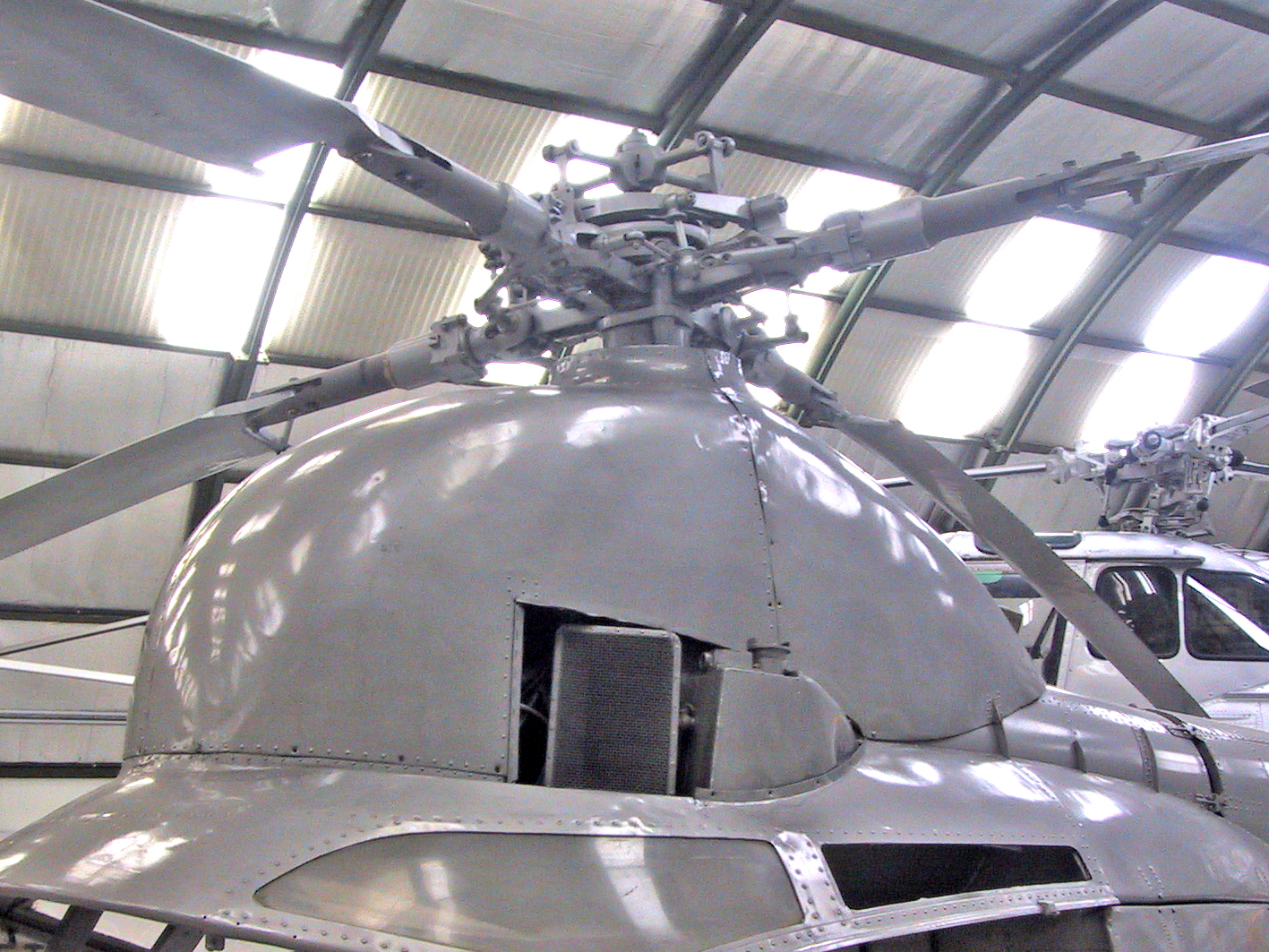
Aerotécnica AC-14, Rotor and top detail

== See also ==
- Aerotécnica

Related development

- AC-11
- AC-12
- AC-13

Aircraft of comparable role, configuration, and era

- Nord Norelfe
