= Aerotécnica AC-12 =

AC-12
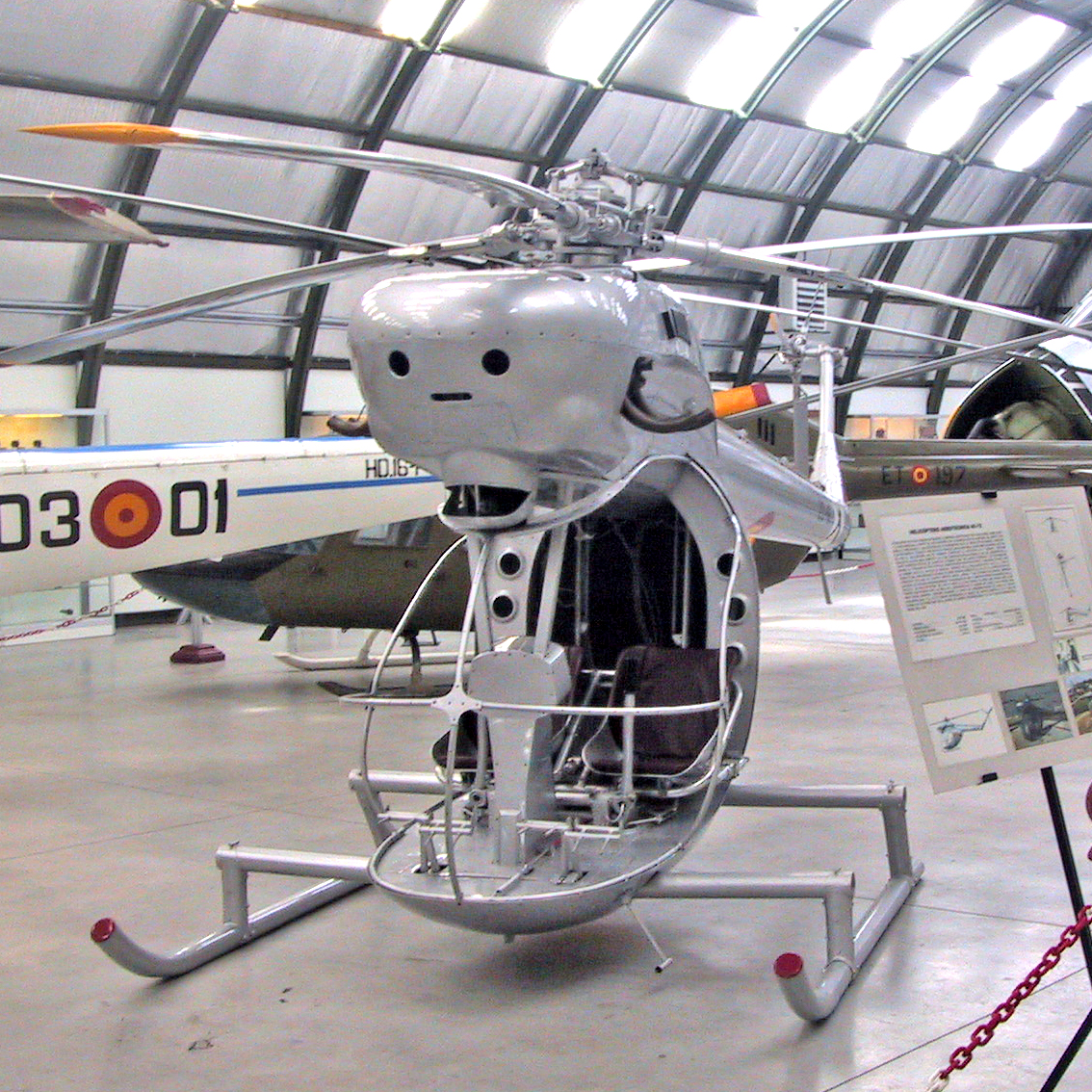

General information
- Type: Light helicopter
- National origin: Spain
- Manufacturer: Aerotécnica
- Designer: Jean Cantinieau
- Primary user: Spanish Air Force
- Number built: 12

History
- First flight: 20 July 1956

The Aerotécnica AC-12 Pepo is a Spanish two-seat light helicopter manufactured in 1956 by Aerotécnica.

== Design and development ==
Aerotécnica AC-12 was designed by Jean Cantinieau and like other Cantinieau designs featured a distinctive "spine" above the fuselage pod that carried the engine ahead of the rotor assembly. Development costs were borne by the Spanish government, and the first of two prototypes took to the air on 20 July 1954.

== Operational history ==
Twelve (including two prototypes) were ordered for the Spanish Air Force where they served for three years under the designation EC-XZ-2.

== Operators ==
Spain

- Spanish Air Force

== Specifications ==
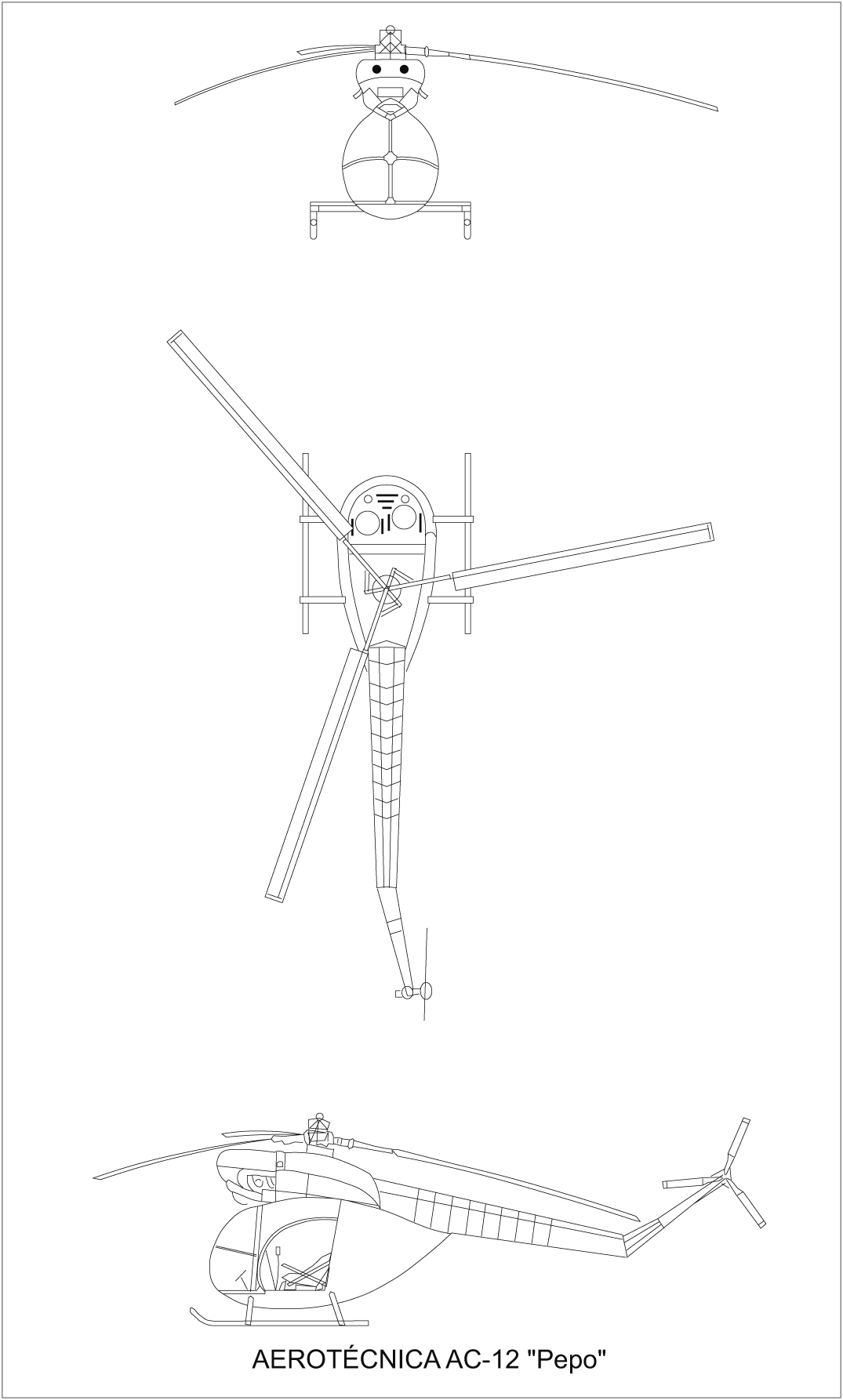
Aerotécnica AC-12 outline

Data from Jane's All The World's Aircraft 1961–62

General characteristics

- Crew: 2
- Length: 7.55 m (24 ft 9 in)
- Height: 2.75 m (9 ft 0 in)
- Empty weight: 500 kg (1,102 lb)
- Gross weight: 750 kg (1,653 lb)
- Max takeoff weight: 820 kg (1,808 lb)
- Powerplant: 1 × Lycoming O-360-B2A air-cooled flat-four, 125 kW (168 hp)
- Main rotor diameter: 8.50 m (27 ft 11 in)
- Main rotor area: 56.75 m^{2} (610.9 sq ft)

Performance

- Maximum speed: 140 km/h (87 mph, 76 kn)
- Cruise speed: 115 km/h (71 mph, 62 kn)
- Range: 230 km (140 mi, 120 nmi) (normal range)
- Ferry range: 450 km (280 mi, 240 nmi) (with auxiliary tanks)
- Endurance: 2 hours
- Service ceiling: 4,000 m (13,000 ft)
- Rate of climb: 5.00 m/s (985 ft/min)

== Gallery ==
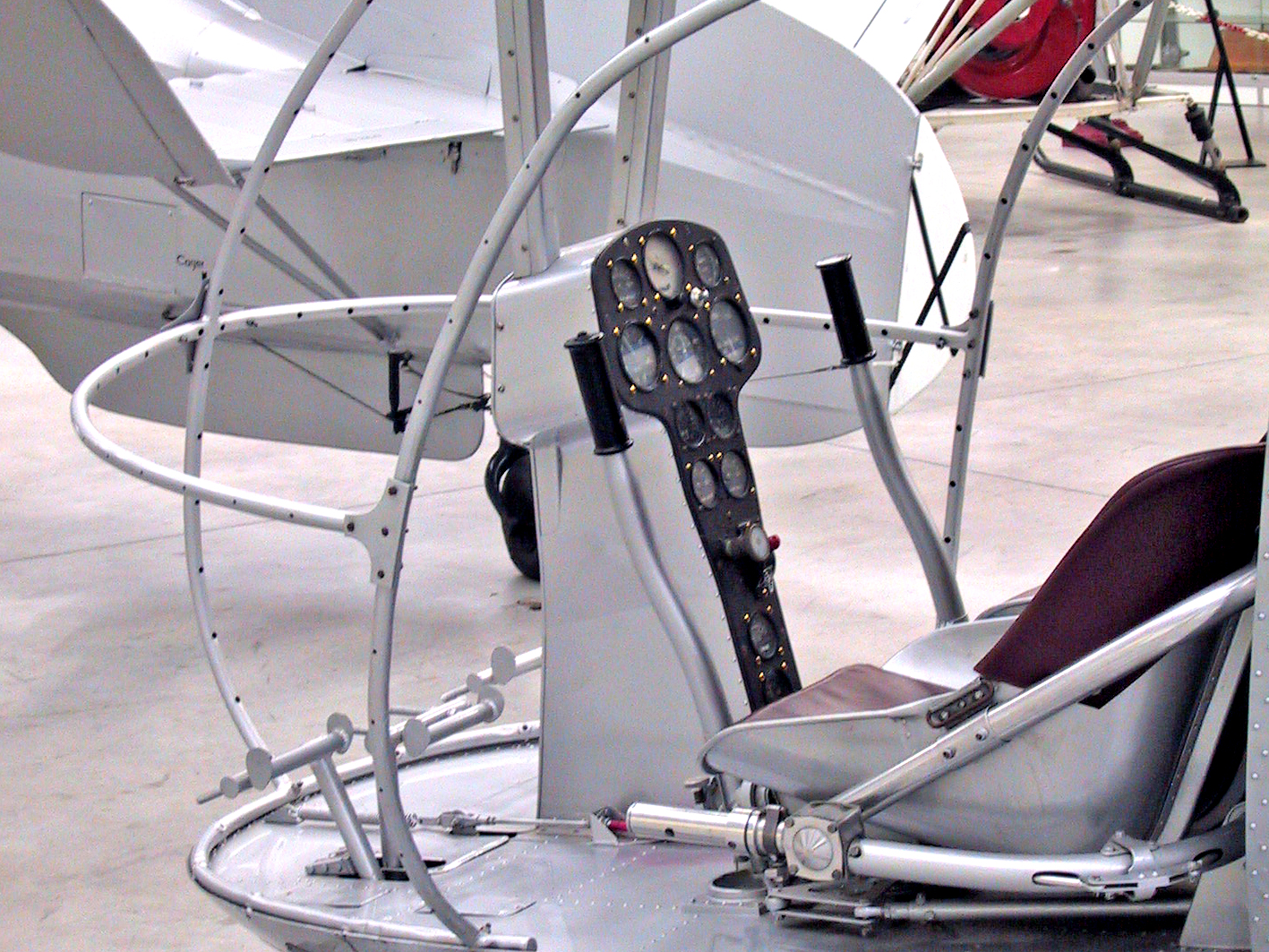
Cockpit detail

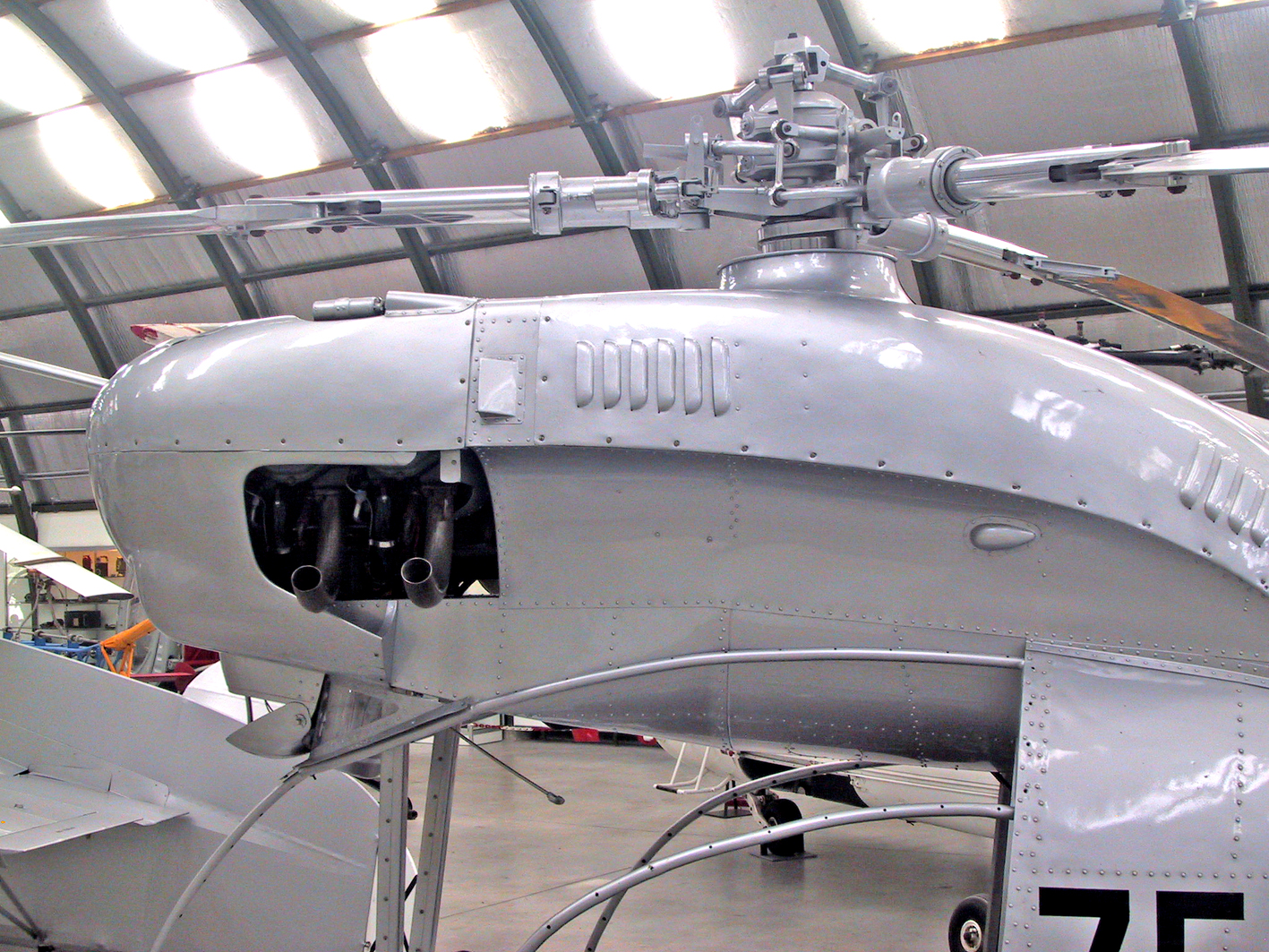
Rotor and top detail

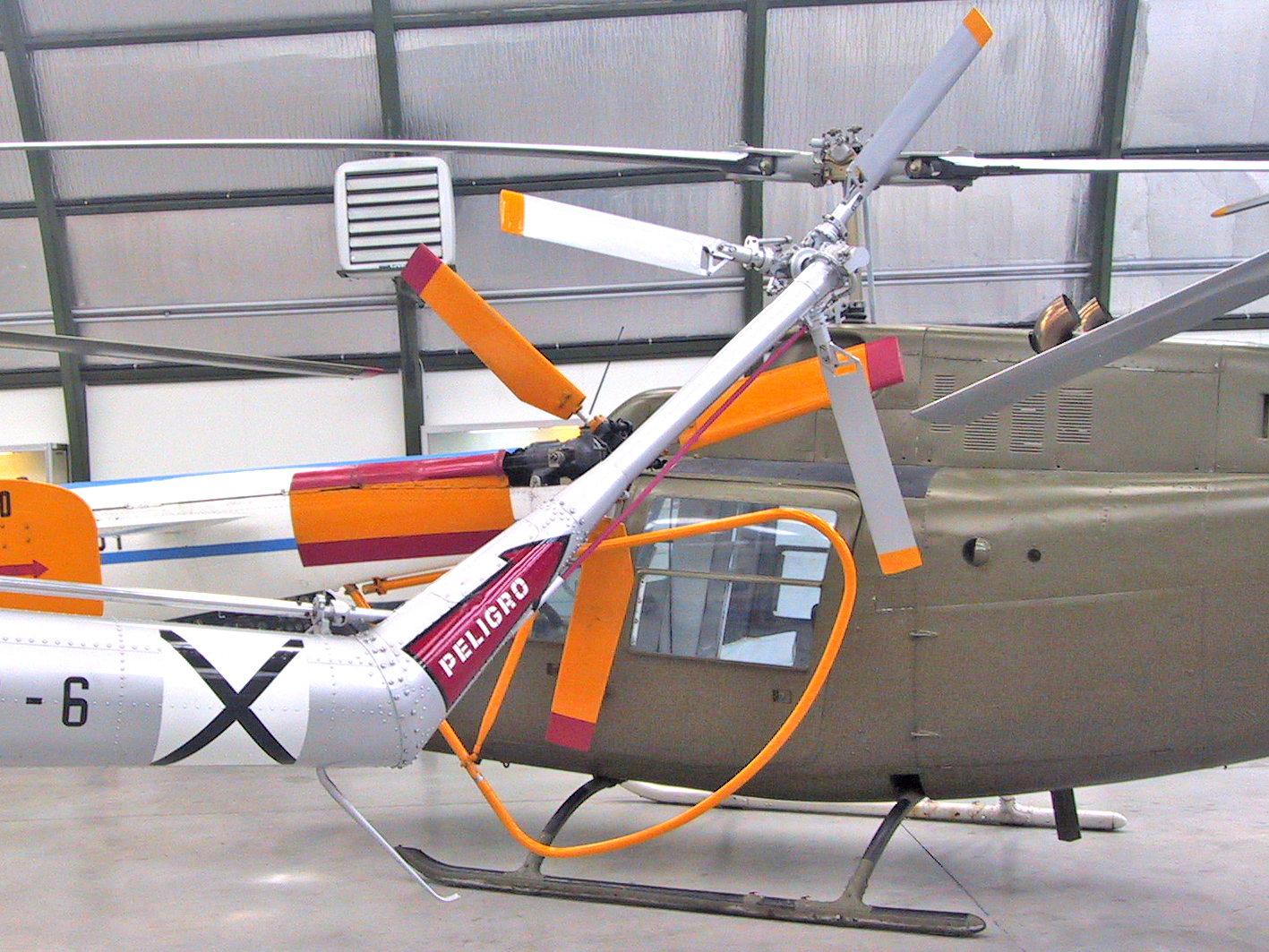

== See also ==
Related development

- AC-11
- AC-13
- AC-14
