= Matra-Cantinieau MC-101 =

MC-101
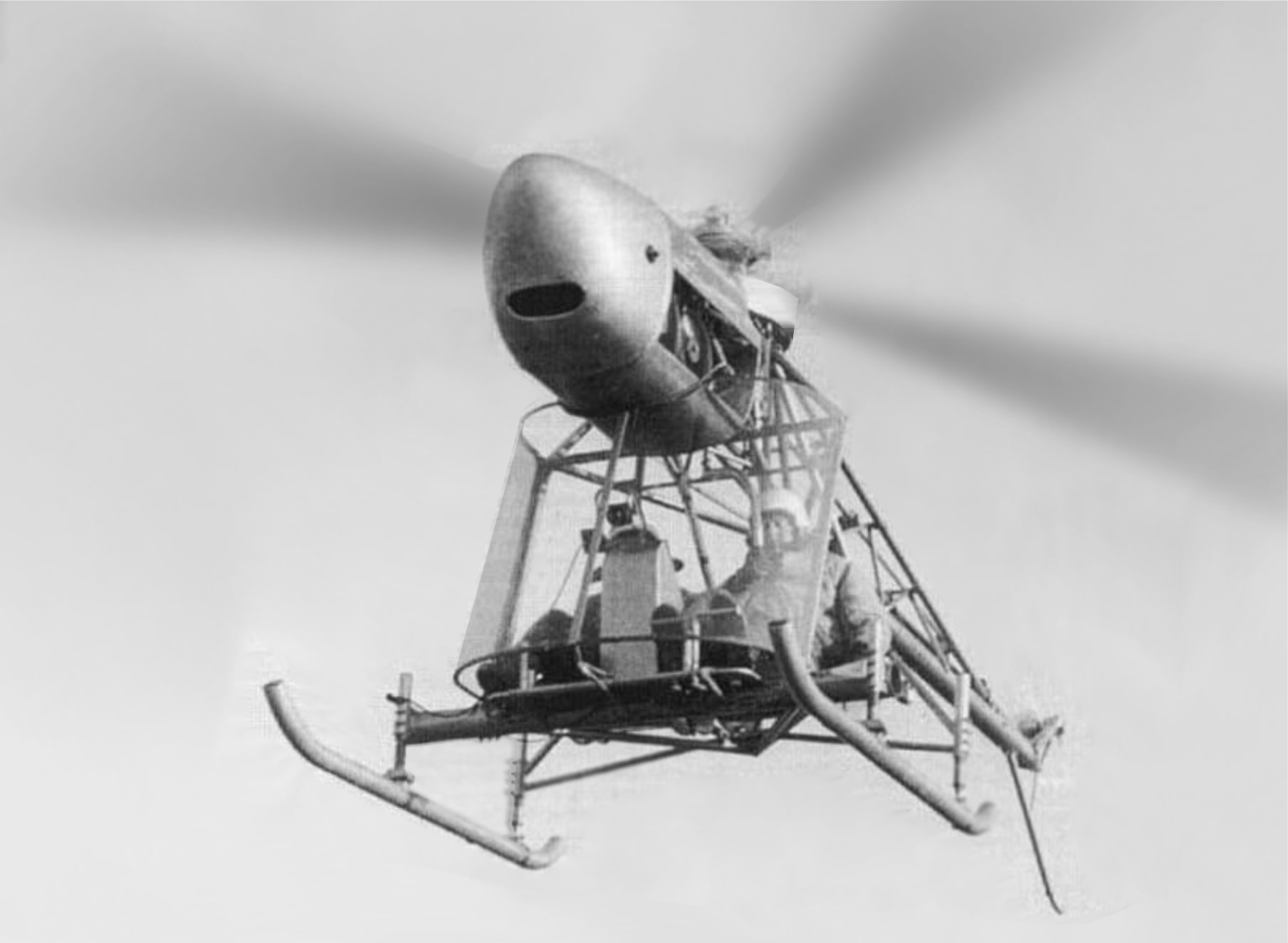

General information
- Type: Experimental helicopter
- National origin: France
- Manufacturer: Matra
- Designer: Jean Cantinieau
- Number built: 1

History
- First flight: 11 November 1952
- Developed from: Cantinieau C-100
- Variant: Aerotécnica AC-12

The Matra-Cantinieau MC-101 was an early 1950s French experimental two seat helicopter of conventional tail rotor configuration but with its engine mounted close to the main rotor, above the seating.

== Design and development ==
The helicopters designed by Jean Cantinieau were distinguished by having an engine positioned in front and immediately below the main rotor drive shaft, above the cockpit. The first of the series was the Cantinieau C-100, which had an open tube frame structure with a braced single tube tail boom, four wheel undercarriage and a 60 kW (80 hp) Minié engine. It first flew in September 1951.

Cantinieau went to the Société Matra to build a two-seat development, the MC-101. This was also an open steel tube design, more complex particularly in the tail boom, though the undercarriage was reduced to simple skids 1.8 m (71 in) apart. It had a 78 kW (105 hp) Hirth HM-504 engine, enclosed in a long, smooth nosed but partially open sided cowling, driving the oscillating rotor hub via a 41:6 reduction gearbox, clutch and Paulstra universal joint. The rotor blades were machined from duralumin. A three blade tail rotor was driven via another Paulstra joint and cardan shaft.

The MC-101 carried two pilots side by side with dual control. There was no cabin but they were protected behind a large perspex screen with rounded vertical edges. It flew for the first time on 11 November 1952. Only one was built.

In 1953 Cantinieau was appointed as director of the Spanish company Aerotécnica's new helicopter division, which also acquired the rights to the MC-101 from Matra. The Hirth engine was replaced with a more powerful 112 kW (150 hp) air-cooled flat four Lycoming O-320, in order to cope better with Madrid's hot and high atmosphere, and the helicopter was renamed the Aerotécnica AC-11. Further development led to the Aerotécnica AC-12 with an enclosed fuselage and cabin.

== Variants ==
Matra-Cantinieau MC-101
78 kW (105 hp) Hirth HM-504 engine.
Aerotécnica AC-11
MC-101 with 112 kW (150 hp) Lycoming O-320 engine.

== Specifications (MC-101) ==
Data from Jane's All the World's Aircraft 1953-54

General characteristics

- Crew: 2
- Length: 6.70 m (22 ft 0 in) (fuselage)
- Height: 2.30 m (7 ft 7 in)
- Empty weight: 400 kg (882 lb)
- Gross weight: 600 kg (1,323 lb)
- Fuel capacity: 40 kg (88 lb)
- Powerplant: 1 × Hirth HM-504 inverted four cylinder piston engine, 78 kW (105 hp)
- Main rotor diameter: 8.0 m (26 ft 3 in)
- Main rotor area: 50.3 m^{2} (541 sq ft)

Performance

- Cruise speed: 100 km/h (62 mph, 54 kn)
- Endurance: 2 hr
