= Masquito M80 =

Belgian ultralight helicopter

M80

General information
- Type: Ultralight helicopter
- National origin: Belgium
- Manufacturer: Masquito Aircraft
- Number built: 4

History
- First flight: May 1996 (M58)
- Developed from: Maschelin M58 Masquito

The Masquito M80 was a Belgian two-seat ultralight helicopter designed and built by Masquito Aircraft.

== Design and development ==
The prototype was designated the Maschelin M58 Masquito. It was a conventional pod and boom design and was powered by a 64 hp (48 kW) Rotax 582 engine driving a two-bladed main rotor and a two-bladed tail rotor. It had two side-by-side seats and was fitted with two fixed skids as a landing gear. The M58 first flew in May 1996; it was later modified to the proposed production standard with a Jabiru 2200 engine and re-designated the M80. Three further M80 prototypes were built but the type failed to gain the appropriate certification and no others were produced.

A Belgian company, D-Motor was set up to design and build a suitable motor for the M80. Two engines with a high power-to-weight ratio were produced: first, the D-Motor LF26 (a 92 hp (69 kW) flat four) and, later, the D-Motor LF39 (a 125 hp (93 kW) flat-six). Unlike the Jabiru motor, these Belgian horizontally-opposed engines have fuel-injection, liquid-cooling and, having side-valves, are ultra-compact, .

== Variants ==
Maschelin M58 Masquito
Prototype with a Rotax 582 engine.
Masquito M80
Production variant with a Jabiru 2200 engine.

== Specifications (M80) ==
Data from

General characteristics

- Crew: 2
- Length: 5.80 m (19 ft 0.25 in)
- Height: 2.25 m (7 ft 4.5 in)
- Empty weight: 170 kg (375 lb)
- Gross weight: 390 kg (859 lb)
- Powerplant: 1 × Jabiru 2200 flat-four piston , 60 kW (80 hp)
- Main rotor diameter: 4.60 m (15 ft 1 in)
- Main rotor area: 16.62 m^{2} (178.9 sq ft)

Performance

- Maximum speed: 180 km/h (112 mph, 97 kn)
- Cruise speed: 148 km/h (92 mph, 80 kn)
- Range: 680 km (422 mi, 367 nmi)
- Service ceiling: 3,050 m (10,000 ft)
- Rate of climb: 5.6 m/s (1,100 ft/min)

== See also ==
Related lists

- List of rotorcraft
