= D-Motor =

Belgian aircraft engine manufacturer

D-Motor International
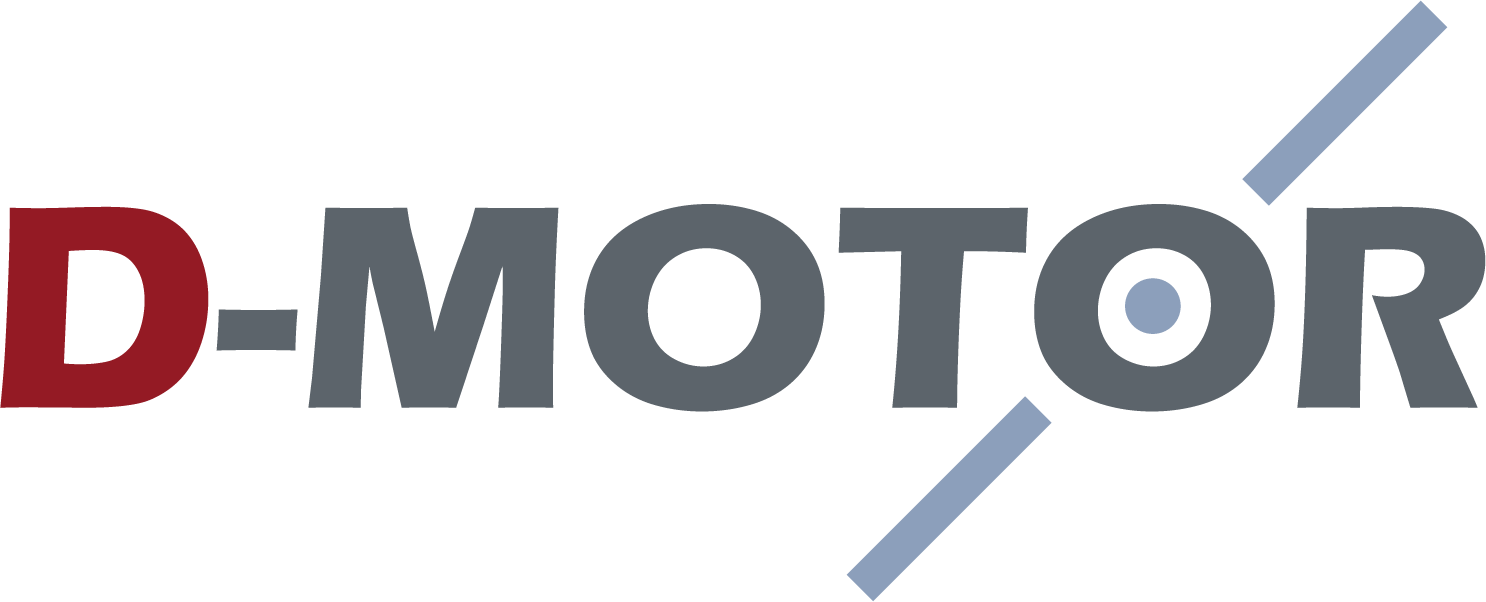
- Company type: Privately held company
- Industry: Aerospace
- Founded: 2010
- Founder: Peter Desmet
- Headquarters: Deerlijk, Belgium
- Area served: Worldwide
- Key people: Peter Desmet, CEO - Kathy Vercruysse, CFO
- Products: Aircraft engines
- Subsidiaries: D-Motor Beijing, D-Motor USA, D-Motor Canada, D-Motor Germany
- Website: www.d-motor.eu

former company logo used until 2019

D-Motor is a Belgian aircraft engine manufacturer based in Deerlijk. The company specializes in the design and manufacture of aircraft engines for homebuilt and ultralight aircraft.

The company was formed in about 2009 to develop an engine to replace the Rotax 582 and Jabiru 2200 in the Belgian Masquito M80 helicopter project. The resulting engine was first shown in 2010 in Brussels, Belgium and at the 2010 AERO Friedrichshafen show in Germany. The company raised funds from their Chinese distributor, who became an investor in the company.

The company developed the four-cylinder 92 hp (69 kW) D-Motor LF26 in 2010 and then the derivative six-cylinder 125 hp (93 kW) D-Motor LF39. Both of these Belgian horizontally-opposed engines are liquid-cooled, fuel-injected, and ultra-compact, having side-valves and extremely oversquare cylinder dimensions.

The engines have found applications in gyroplanes like the Niki Lightning as well as fixed wing aircraft, such as the BOT SC07 Speed Cruiser and the Peak Aerospace Me 109R.

== Aircraft engines ==
Summary of aircraft engines built by D-Motor:

- D-Motor LF26 – four-cylinder 92 hp (69 kW)
- D-Motor LF39 – six-cylinder 125 hp (93 kW)
