= Niki Lightning =

Bulgarian autogyro

Lightning
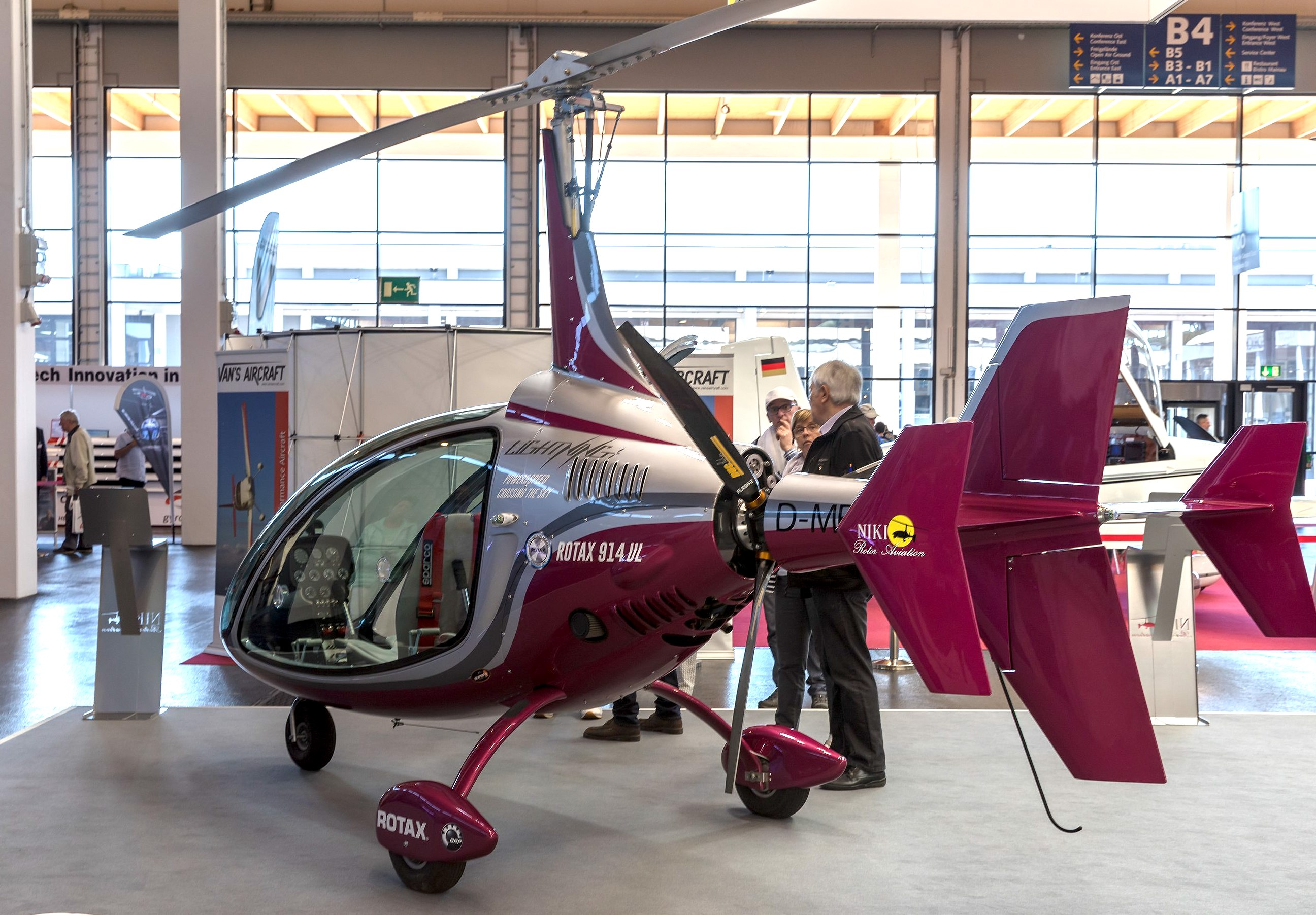

General information
- Type: Autogyro
- National origin: Bulgaria
- Manufacturer: Niki Rotor Aviation
- Status: In production (assembled, 2017)

History
- Manufactured: 2009-present
- Introduction date: 2009
- Variant: Niki Kallithea

The Niki Lightning is a fully enclosed two-seater tricycle autogyro of composite construction, designed and built by Niki Rotor Aviation in Bulgaria. It was introduced in 2009

== Design and development ==
The Lightning's cockpit pod accommodates a pilot and passenger in tandem. The main rotor is two-bladed, with a pre-rotator. Unconventionally the tail boom is mounted though the centre of the propeller shaft. The boom may be unbolted and removed to aid access to the engine and prop.

There is a choice of two very compact D-Motor engines (both liquid-cooled horizontally-opposed side-valve four-strokes): either the 95 hp (71 kW) 4-cylinder LF26 or the 130 hp (97 kW) 6-cylinder LF39. The engine is sited behind the cockpit, driving a 3- or 4-bladed ground-adjustable pusher propeller which is coaxial with the tail boom. The D-Motor engines are direct-drive units redlined at 3,000 rpm. The engines are sited beneath the thrust line of the propeller; instead of using a gearbox, the Lightning uses a multi-belt-drive reduction system of about 3:2 ratio, resulting in an efficient propeller speed of up to 2,000 rpm. This arrangement avoids the necessity of a tailboom beneath the propeller, giving a smoother empenage and reducing drag. Beneath the tail-fin a spring-steel tailskid is fitted, to inhibit propeller strikes.

Consuming some 15 L (4.0 US gal; 3.3 imp gal) of avgas per hour, the autogyro has an endurance of 4 hours, with 30 minutes reserve. Its cruise speed of 81 kn (150 km/h; 93 mph) gives the autogyro a range of over 320 nmi (590 km; 370 mi). It has a take-off roll of 70 m (230 ft), and a landing roll of 20 m (66 ft). The Lightning may be flown with its side doors removed.

An alternative engine for the Niki Lightning is the Rotax 914UL (but the normal Rotax gearbox would be dispensed with in favour of the drive belts).

== Specifications (D-Motor LF39) ==
Data from US distributor

General characteristics

- Length: 4.55 m (14 ft 11 in)
- Height: 2.85 m (9 ft 4 in)
- Empty weight: 265 kg (584 lb)
- Max takeoff weight: 560 kg (1,235 lb)
- Fuel capacity: 70 L (18 US gal; 15 imp gal)
- Powerplant: 1 × D-Motor LF39 6-cyl horizontally opposed, liquid-cooled, piston engine, 97 kW (130 hp)
- Main rotor diameter: 8.5 m (27 ft 11 in)
- Propellers: 4-bladed, 1.75 m (5 ft 9 in) diameter

Performance

- Maximum speed: 170 km/h (110 mph, 92 kn)
- Cruise speed: 150 km/h (93 mph, 81 kn) *Minimum speed 35 km/h (19 kn; 22 mph)
- Endurance: 4h with 30 min reserve
- Service ceiling: 3,000 m (9,800 ft)
- Rate of climb: 5 m/s (980 ft/min)

== See also ==
- AutoGyro Calidus
- Niki Kallithea
- RotorSport UK Calidus
- Sport Copter Lightning
