= Ultra Cruiser =

Ultra Cruiser, UltraCruiser or Ultracruiser may refer to:

- Bilsam Ultra Cruiser, a Polish microlight aircraft design
- Hummel Ultracruiser, an American ultralight aircraft design
