= Sky Cruiser =

Sky Cruiser may refer to:

- Bilsam Sky Cruiser, a Polish aircraft design
- Sky Cruiser, an EP by the American band Ween
