= Foxcon =

Foxcon may refer to:

- Foxcon Aviation, an Australian aircraft manufacturer
- Foxconn, a Taiwanese computer manufacturer, also known formally as the Hon Hai Precision Industry Co., Ltd.
