= Niki Kallithea =

Bulgarian autogyro

Kallithea
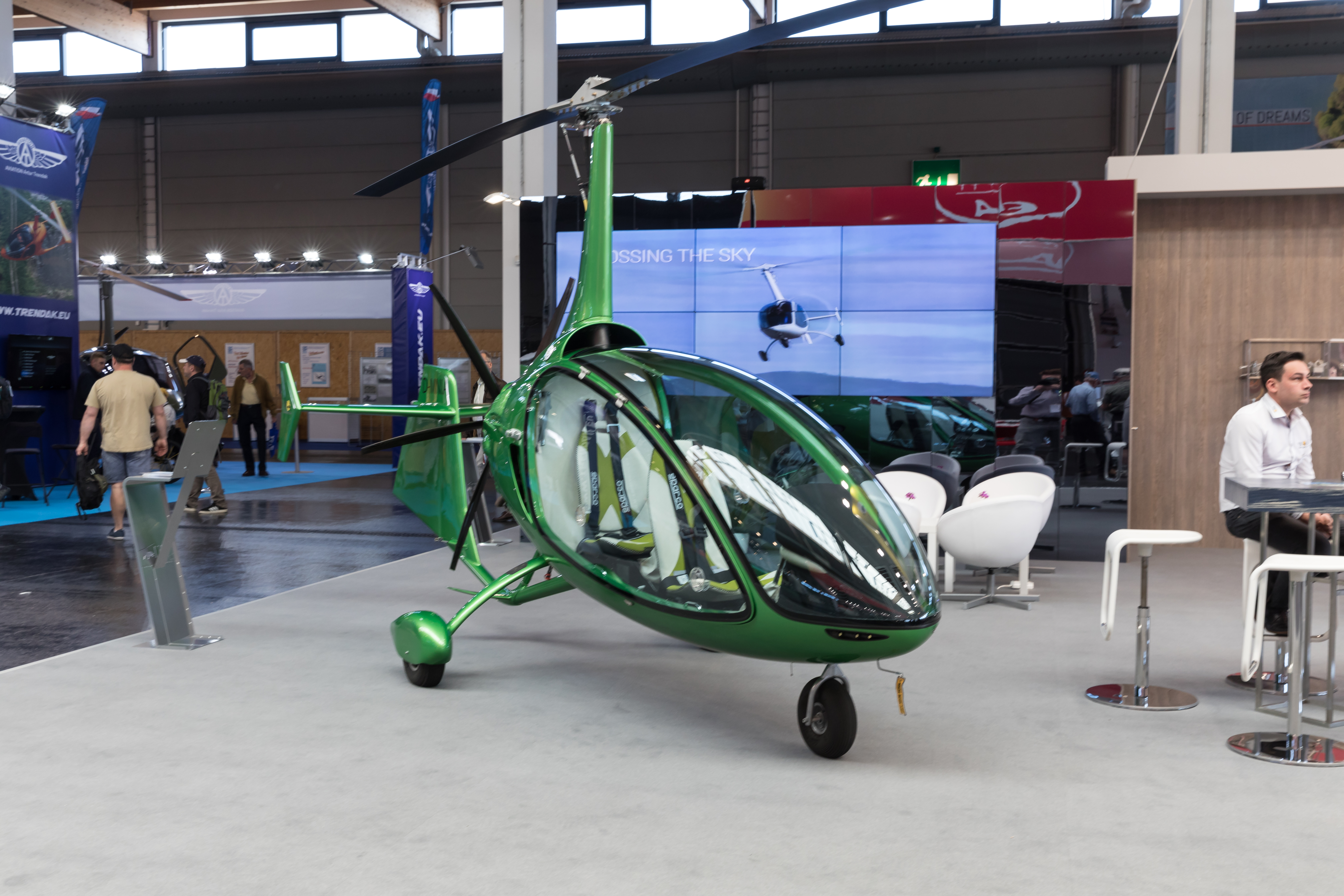

General information
- Type: Autogyro
- National origin: Bulgaria
- Manufacturer: Niki Rotor Aviation
- Status: In production (2017)

History
- Manufactured: 2011-present
- Introduction date: 2011
- Developed from: Niki Lightning

The Niki Kallithea (the best view) is a Bulgarian autogyro designed and produced by Niki Rotor Aviation of Pravets, introduced in 2011. The aircraft is supplied complete and ready-to-fly.

== Design and development ==
The Kallithea is a development of the 2009 Niki Lightning, differing mainly in its use of a conventional two-tube tail boom that passes under the pusher propeller instead of mounting the tail boom through the propeller hub.

The Kallithea features a single main rotor, a two-seats-in tandem enclosed cockpit with fold-up doors, tricycle landing gear and a four-cylinder, liquid and air-cooled, four stroke 100 hp (75 kW) Rotax 912 or six-cylinder, liquid cooled side-valve four-stroke flat six 4-litre petrol 120 hp (89 kW) D-Motor LF39 aircraft engine in pusher configuration. The doors can also be removed for flight.

The aircraft fuselage is a monocoque structure made from composites and fibreglass. Its two-bladed Vortech or Sport Copter rotor has a diameter of 8.5 m (27.9 ft) and a chord of 21 cm (8.3 in). The aircraft has a typical empty weight of 250 kg (551 lb) and a gross weight of 450 kg (992 lb), giving a useful load of 200 kg (441 lb). With full fuel of 80 litres (18 imp gal; 21 US gal) the payload for the pilot, passenger and baggage is 143 kg (315 lb).

== Specifications (Kallithea) ==
Data from Tacke

General characteristics

- Crew: one
- Capacity: one passenger
- Empty weight: 250 kg (551 lb)
- Gross weight: 450 kg (992 lb)
- Fuel capacity: 80 litres (18 imp gal; 21 US gal)
- Powerplant: 1 × D-Motor LF39 six-cylinder, liquid cooled side-valve four-stroke flat six 4-litre petrol aircraft engine, 89 kW (120 hp)
- Main rotor diameter: 8.5 m (27 ft 11 in)
- Main rotor area: 57 m^{2} (610 sq ft)
- Propellers: 4-bladed ground adjustable

Performance

- Maximum speed: 180 km/h (110 mph, 97 kn)
- Cruise speed: 150 km/h (93 mph, 81 kn)
- Rate of climb: 6 m/s (1,200 ft/min)
- Disk loading: 7.9 kg/m^{2} (1.6 lb/sq ft)

== See also ==
- List of rotorcraft
