= Svenska Flygfabriken LN-3 Seagull =

Amphibian kitplane produced in Sweden

LN-3 Seagull

General information
- Type: High wing pusher amphibian
- Manufacturer: Svenska Flygfabriken AB

History
- First flight: 5 February 2008

The Svenska Flygfabriken LN-3 Seagull is a two-seater single-engine pusher configuration amphibian kitplane made from composite material, powered by a D-Motor LF26, D-Motor LF39 or Rotax 912/914 engine. It is fitted with retracting conventional landing gear. The manufacturer is Svenska Flygfabriken AB, based in Sundsvall, Sweden. Work started on building the prototype in 2003, and the maiden flight was made on 5 February 2008 at Midlanda Airport. Take-offs and landings on land, ice and water have all been tested during the test program..

The designer of this aircraft is Lage Norberg, who has been working on the design since the early 1980s. It is intended to match the regulatory standards for amphibian homebuilt aircraft in the Ultralight, Microlight and Light Sport Aircraft Categories, as well as the FAR 23 Aerobatic category.

== Specifications (LN-3 Seagull) ==
Data from

General characteristics

- Crew: 1
- Capacity: 1 passenger
- Length: 6.72 m (22 ft 1 in)
- Wingspan: 10.83 m (35 ft 6 in)
- Height: 2.15 m (7 ft 1 in)
- Wing area: 10.6 m^{2} (114 sq ft)
- Empty weight: 320 kg (705 lb)
- Max takeoff weight: 600 kg (1,323 lb)
- Powerplant: 1 × D-Motor LF26 4-cylinder air-cooled horizontally-opposed piston engine 68.9 kW (93.7 PS; 92.4 hp) for take-off

or 82.4 kW (112 PS; 111 hp) D-Motor LF39
or Rotax 912
or Rotax 914

- Propellers: 2-bladed fixed-pitch propeller

Performance

- Maximum speed: 190 km/h (120 mph, 100 kn)
- Stall speed: 80 km/h (50 mph, 43 kn)
- Range: 1,200 km (750 mi, 650 nmi)
- Rate of climb: 6 m/s (1,200 ft/min)

== See also ==
- Republic RC-3 Seabee
