= LN3 =

LN3, LN-3, or ln3 may refer to:

- LN-3 inertial navigation system
- Buick LN3 engine
- Svenska Flygfabriken LN-3 Seagull
- Natural logarithm of 3
