= Foxcon Terrier 200 =

Australian light sport aircraft

Terrier 200
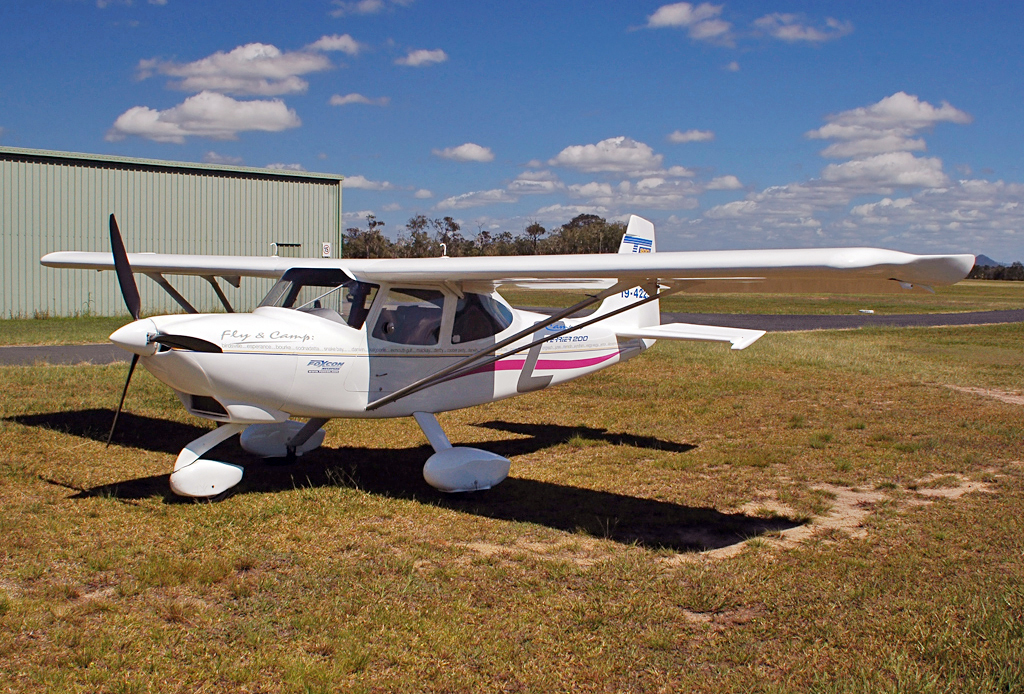
- Foxcon Terrier 200C

General information
- Type: Light-sport aircraft
- National origin: Australia
- Manufacturer: Foxcon Aviation
- Status: In production

The Foxcon Terrier 200 is an Australian light-sport aircraft, designed and produced by Foxcon Aviation of Mackay, Queensland. The aircraft is supplied as a kit for amateur construction or as a complete ready-to-fly-aircraft.

== Design and development ==
The Terrier 200 was designed to comply with the US light-sport aircraft rules. It features a strut-braced high-wing, a two-seats-in-side-by-side configuration enclosed cockpit, fixed tricycle landing gear and a single engine in tractor configuration.

The aircraft is made from vacuum-molded composites with the design goal of strength at a light weight. Its 8.7 m (28.5 ft) span wing employs a Chris Mark 4 airfoil and mounts flaps. The standard engines available in 2012 were the 80 hp (60 kW) D-Motor LF26, the 100 hp (75 kW) Rotax 912ULS, the 100 hp (75 kW) Subaru EA 81 and the 116 hp (87 kW) Lycoming IO-233-LSA four-stroke powerplants. By 2015 only the Subaru EA 81 and Rotax 912ULS were still offered. Floats for water operations are optional.

== Variants ==
Terrier 200
Base model with two molded individual seats.
Terrier 200C
Model with bench seats that fold into a 200 by 105 cm (79 by 41 in) bed for camping.

== Specifications (Terrier 200) ==
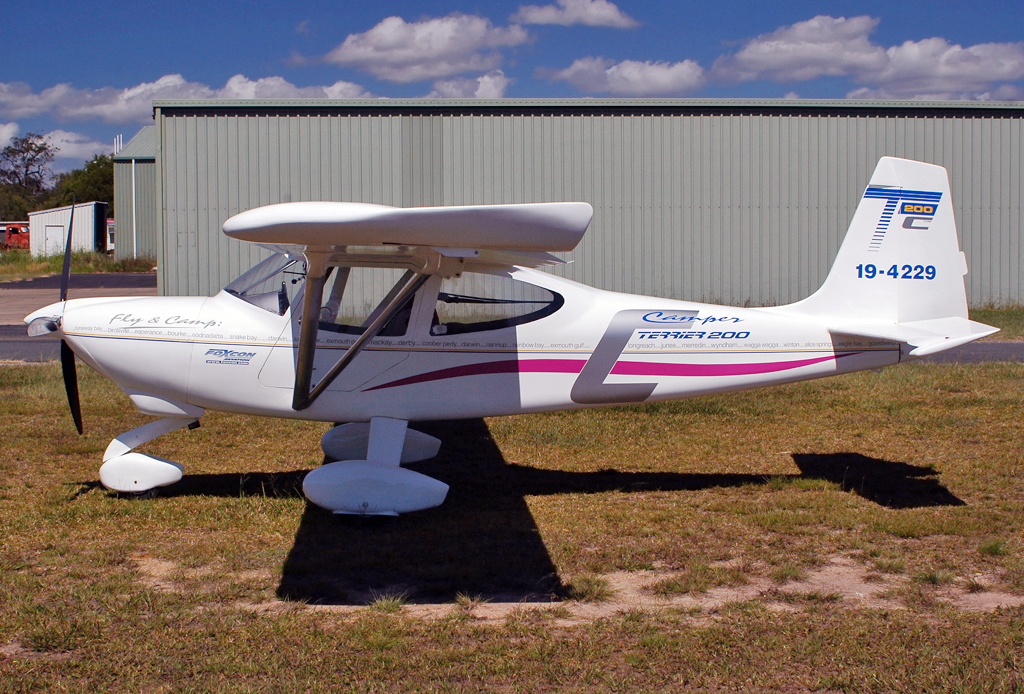
Foxcon Terrier 200

Data from Bayerl and Foxcon

General characteristics

- Crew: one
- Capacity: one passenger
- Length: 6.10 m (20 ft 0 in)
- Wingspan: 8.7 m (28 ft 7 in)
- Height: 2.30 m (7 ft 7 in)
- Airfoil: Chris Mark 4
- Empty weight: 340 kg (750 lb)
- Gross weight: 600 kg (1,323 lb)
- Fuel capacity: 88 litres (19 imp gal; 23 US gal)
- Powerplant: 1 × Subaru EA 81 four cylinder, liquid-cooled, four stroke automotive engine, 75 kW (101 hp)

Performance

- Maximum speed: 220 km/h (140 mph, 120 kn)
- Cruise speed: 200 km/h (130 mph, 110 kn)
- Stall speed: 70 km/h (44 mph, 38 kn)
- Never exceed speed: 240 km/h (150 mph, 130 kn)
- Endurance: 6 hours
- g limits: +6/-4
- Maximum glide ratio: 12:1
- Rate of climb: 7.5 m/s (1,480 ft/min)
