= D-Motor LF26 =

Belgian aircraft engine

- Type: Piston aero engine
- National origin: Belgium
- Manufacturer: D-Motor
- Developed into: D-Motor LF39

The D-Motor LF26 is a lightweight liquid cooled side-valve four-stroke flat four, 2.7 litre petrol aircraft engine, produced by D-Motor in Deerlijk, Belgium.

== Design and development ==
This direct-drive aero-engine is unusual in two respects: it is very oversquare with a bore:stroke ratio of 1.295:1, and it has a side-valve (flathead) valvetrain. The designer determined that since maximum continuous power output (65.3 kW) was to be developed at only 2800 rpm, the extra weight and complexity of overhead valves (OHV) would be superfluous. The resulting engine is compact and lightweight, with a dry weight of 58 kg (128 lb), and a maximum power-to-weight ratio of 1.09 kW/kg (wet; coolant fluids weigh 5 kg (11 lb)). The engine has port injection, a dry sump lubrication system, and dual ignition.

== Variants ==
With the aid of funding from the Belgian government, D-Motor has developed a derivative 4-litre flat-six engine, the D-Motor LF39, which is claimed to produce 125 PS (92 kW) and to have dry weight of 78 kg (172 lb).

== Applications ==
- BOT SC07 Speed Cruiser
- Foxcon Terrier 200
- Niki Lightning
- Peak Aerospace Me 109R
- Raj Hamsa X-Air
- Slepcev Storch
- Sherwood Ranger

== Specifications ==
Reference: D-Motor

=== General characteristics ===
- Type: 4-cylinder liquid-cooled horizontally-opposed piston engine
- Bore: 103.6mm (4.079 in)
- Stroke: 80 mm (3.15 in)
- Displacement: 2690 cm^{3}
- Length: 611 mm
- Width: 533 mm
- Height: 382 mm
- Dry weight: 58 kg with exhaust, radiator & external oil tank

=== Components ===
- Valvetrain: camshaft in block, side valves
- Fuel system: port injection
- Fuel type: AVGAS 100/130 or petrol 91, 93, 95, 98 RON
- Oil system: Dry sump
- Cooling system: liquid cooling

=== Performance ===
- Power output: Max 68.9 kW (93.7 PS; 92.4 hp) at 3,100 RPM; continuous 65.3 kW (88.8 PS; 87.6 hp) at 2,800 RPM
- Compression ratio: 8:1
- Fuel consumption: 26 litres/h at 100 % power
- Power-to-weight ratio: Max 1.09 kW/kg (wet); continuous 1.04kW/kg (wet)

== See also ==
Comparable engines

- HKS 700E
- Jabiru 2200
- KFM 112M
- Revmaster R-2300
- Rotax 912
- Sauer S 2200 UL
- Sauer S 2400 UL
- Sauer S 2100 ULT
- ULPower UL260i
- Verner 133M

Related lists

- List of aircraft engines
