= D-Motor LF39 =

- Type: Piston aero engine
- National origin: Belgium
- Manufacturer: D-Motor
- First run: July 2013
- Developed from: D-Motor LF26

The D-Motor LF39 is a lightweight liquid cooled side-valve four-stroke flat six 4 litre petrol aircraft engine, produced by D-Motor in Deerlijk, Belgium. It is a derivative of the flat four D-Motor LF26.

== Design ==
The LF39 produces 125 hp (93 kW) and has a dry weight of 74 kg (163 lb). The power curve is virtually linear from 50 kW @ 1920 rpm to 91.55 kW @ 3100 rpm. Just like its smaller sibling, the LF26, this direct-drive aero-engine has a side-valve (flathead) valvetrain. The engine has port injection, a dry sump lubrication system, and dual ignition.

== Development ==
With the aid of funding from the Belgian government, the D-Motor LF39 was developed from the LF26. The company encountered problems with the casting of the flat-six cylinder block and there were further problems with the flywheel/alternator, but these were solved using a lighter flywheel with neodymium magnets.

The 2014 expected price was €17,800.

In September 2014, EDM Aerotec announced the results of test flying the engine in their EDM Aerotec CoAX 2D/2R coaxial rotor helicopter, saying, "We are glad to present the 6 cylinder in action. After more than 100 hours testflying ... the coax helicopter equipped with the 6 cylinder... (proved) a perfect combination according to the test pilots." and added, "Another 6 cylinder has been installed in a test plane in Belgium".

== Applications ==
- EDM Aerotec CoAX 2D/2R
- Hungaro Copter
- Niki Kallithea
- Niki Lightning

== Specifications ==
Reference: D-Motor

=== General characteristics ===
- Type: horizontally opposed flat six
- Bore: 103.6mm (4.1 in)
- Stroke: 79 mm (2.91 in)
- Displacement: 3,993 cc (244 cu in)
- Length: 648.7 mm (25.54 in)
- Width: 566 mm (22.28 in)
- Height: 423.4 mm (16.67 in)
- Dry weight: 74 kg (163 lb) with exhaust, radiator & external oil tank

=== Components ===
- Valvetrain: camshaft in block, side valves
- Fuel system: port injection
- Fuel type: 100/130 Avgas or petrol 91, 93, 95, 98 RON
- Oil system: Dry sump
- Cooling system: liquid cooling

=== Performance ===
- Power output: 82.4 kW (112 PS) at 2,800 RPM (max peak power: 91.55 kW (124 PS) at 3,100 RPM)
- Compression ratio: 8:1
- Power-to-weight ratio: 1.26 kW/kg

== See also ==
Comparable engines

- Jabiru 3300
- Rotax 914
- Wilksch WAM 120

Related lists

- List of aircraft engines
