= Bilsam Aviation =

Polish aircraft manufacturer

Bilsam Aviation Industries Sp.Z00
- Company type: Spółka z ograniczoną odpowiedzialnością
- Industry: Aerospace
- Headquarters: Poznań, Poland
- Products: Kit aircraft, powered parachutes, paramotors
- Website: bilsamaviation.com

Bilsam Aviation Industries Sp. z o.o. is a Polish aircraft manufacturer based in Poznań. The company specializes in the design and manufacture of ultralight aircraft in the form of plans and kits for amateur construction and ready-to-fly aircraft for the US FAR 103 Ultralight Vehicles rules, the European Fédération Aéronautique Internationale microlight and US light sport aircraft categories. The company also designs and builds its own aircraft engines.

The company is organized as a Spółka z ograniczoną odpowiedzialnością, a Polish limited liability company.

The company has a range of aircraft in its line, including the Bilsam Sky Walker I and Sky Walker II powered parachutes, the Bilsam Sky Walker paramotor and Bilsam Sky Cruiser and Bilsam Ultra Cruiser fixed wing microlights.

The company's website is non-functional and has been so since about 2008, so it is not clear if the company is still in business. In 2007, four former importers of Bilsam aircraft merged to become BOT Aircraft, which went on to build the BOT SC07 Speed Cruiser based on the Bilsam Sky Cruiser. However, there has been little activity from the company since 2014.

== Aircraft ==
Summary of aircraft built by Bilsam Aviation
| Model name | First flight | Number built | Type |
|---|---|---|---|
| Bilsam Sky Walker I | | | Single-seat powered parachute |
| Bilsam Sky Walker II | | | Two-seat powered parachute |
| Bilsam Sky Walker | | | Single-seat paramotor |
| Bilsam Sky Cruiser | | | Two-seat microlight |
| Bilsam Ultra Cruiser | | | Single-seat microlight |
