= EDM Aerotec CoAX 2D/2R =

German helicopter

CoAX 2D/2R
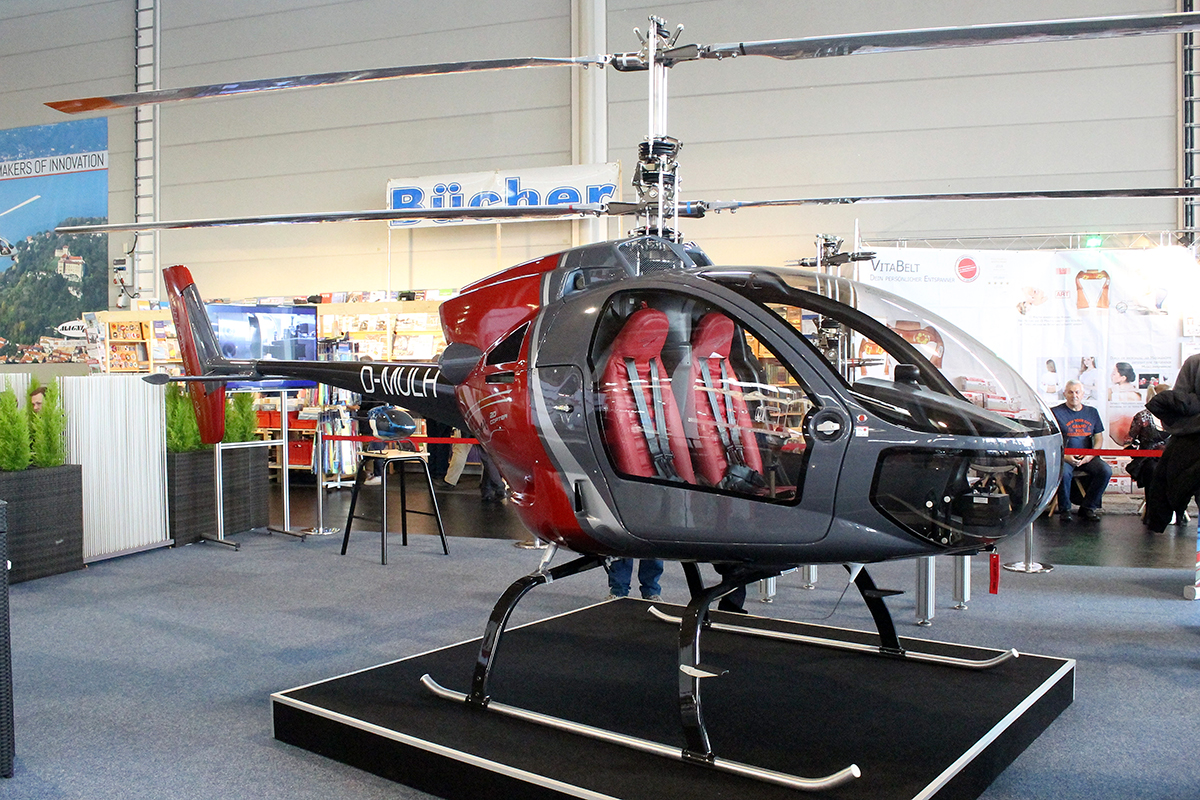
- EDM Aerotec CoAX 2D/2R

General information
- Type: Helicopter
- National origin: Germany
- Manufacturer: EDM Aerotec
- Status: In production (2017)

History
- First flight: 2012

The EDM Aerotec CoAX 2D/2R is a series of German coaxial main rotor helicopters designed and produced by EDM Aerotec of Geisleden. The aircraft is supplied complete and ready-to-fly.

== Design and development ==
The CoAX 2D/2R was originally known as the FLIP 2 (Fly In Perfection) and is a derivative of the FLIP 1, a conventional helicopter with a main and tail rotor.

The CoAX 2D/2R was designed to comply with the European Class 6 microlight helicopter rules, including the category's maximum takeoff weight of 450 kg (992 lb). Design testing commenced in 2012. The newest version of the helicopter, CoAX 600 has an increased maximum takeoff weight of 600kg. This is aligned with the changes in the German regulations for ultralight rotorcraft.

The design features dual coaxial main rotors, a two-seats-in side-by-side configuration enclosed cockpit and skid landing gear with ground handling wheels. The two variants use different power plants.

The aircraft fuselage is made from composites. Its dual composite two-bladed main rotors have a diameter of 6.50 m (21.3 ft). The aircraft has a typical empty weight of 283 kg (624 lb) and a gross weight of 450 kg (992 lb), giving a useful load of 167 kg (368 lb). With full fuel of 48 litres (11 imp gal; 13 US gal) the payload for the pilot, passengers and baggage is 132 kg (291 lb).

== Variants ==
CoAX 600
Current production version in 2025, powered by a six-cylinder, air-cooled, four stroke 160 hp (117.7 KW) ULPower UL390iS engine. This version has a maximum take-off weight of 600kg, complying with the new ultralight regulations in Germany.
CoAX 2D
Current production version in 2017, powered by a six-cylinder, liquid-cooled, four stroke 135 hp (101 kW) D-Motor LF39 engine.
CoAX 2R
Version powered by a four-cylinder, liquid and air-cooled, four stroke 100 hp (75 kW) Rotax 912ULS engine. No longer advertised as available in 2014.
CoAX 600 UAS (Unmanned Aerial System)
An unmanned version of the CoAX 600 was developed in a research and development project by edm aerotec GmbH and the Technical University of Munich. CoAX 600 UAS obtained a permit-to-fly from the LBA via the SORA process and completed successful flight testing at the Magdeburg-Cochstedt Airport (EDBC).

== Specifications (CoAX 2D) ==
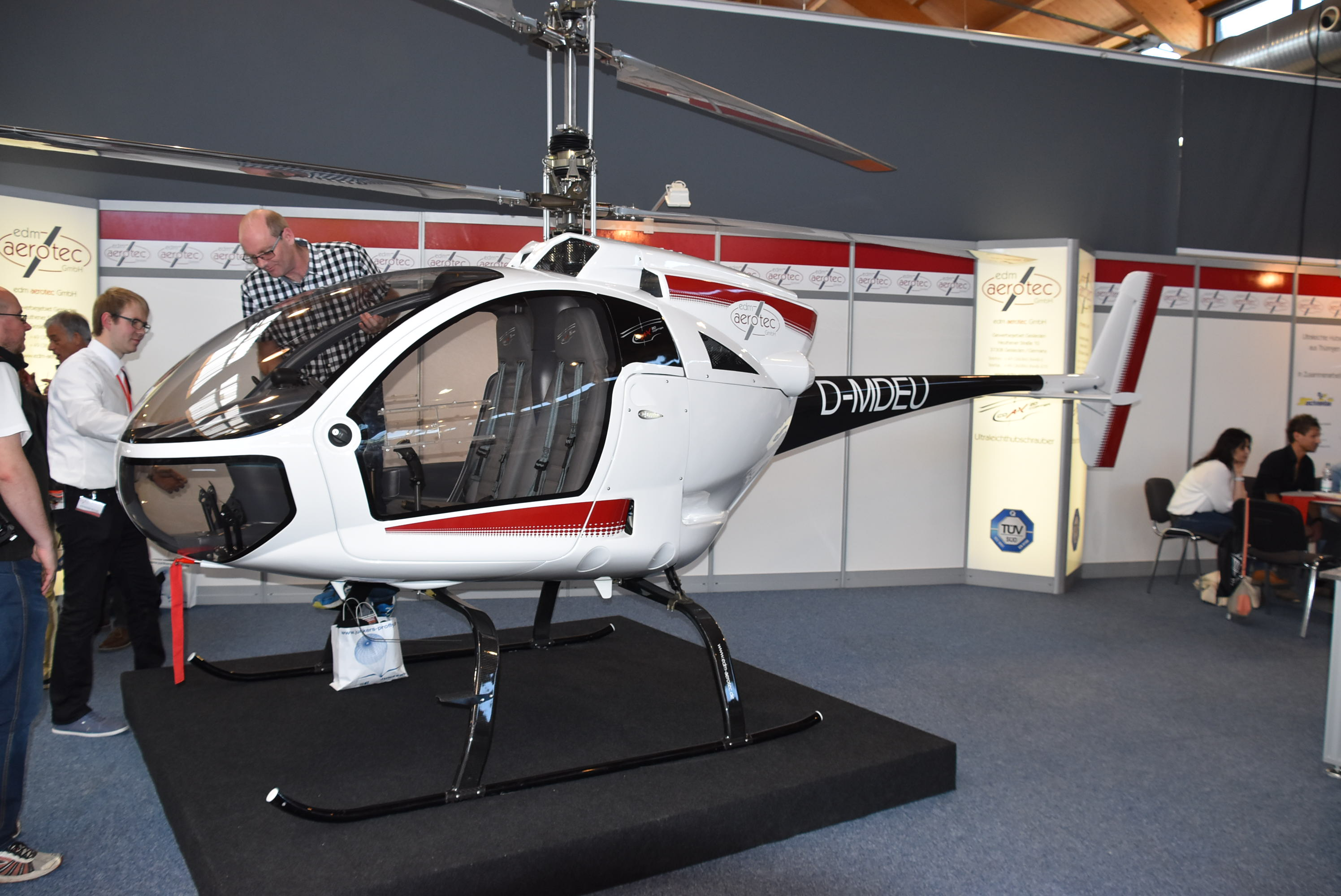
EDM Aerotec Co-Ax 2D at AERO Friedrichshafen 2016

Data from Tacke and manufacturer

General characteristics

- Crew: one
- Capacity: one passenger
- Empty weight: 283 kg (624 lb)
- Gross weight: 450 kg (992 lb)
- Fuel capacity: 48 litres (11 imp gal; 13 US gal)
- Powerplant: 1 × D-Motor LF39 six-cylinder, liquid-cooled, four stroke aircraft engine, 101 kW (135 hp)
- Main rotor diameter: 2 × 6.50 m (21 ft 4 in)
- Main rotor area: 66.3 m^{2} (714 sq ft)

Performance

- Maximum speed: 170 km/h (110 mph, 92 kn)
- Cruise speed: 150 km/h (93 mph, 81 kn)
- Disk loading: 6.7 kg/m^{2} (1.4 lb/sq ft)

== See also ==
- List of rotorcraft
- Dynali H3 EasyFlyer
- Guimbal Cabri G2
- Heli-Sport CH77 Ranabot
- IRI T250A
- Konner K1
- Robinson R22
- Rotorfly R-30
- Schweizer S300
- Winner B150
