= Niki 2004 =

Bulgarian autogyro

General information
- Type: Autogyro
- National origin: Bulgaria
- Manufacturer: Niki Rotor Aviation
- Status: In production (2013)

History
- Introduction date: 2004

The Niki 2004 is a family of Bulgarian autogyros, designed and produced by Niki Rotor Aviation of Pravets. The aircraft is supplied as a kit for amateur construction or as a complete ready-to-fly-aircraft.

== Design and development ==
The Niki 2004 features a single main rotor, a two-seats-in side-by-side configuration enclosed cockpit, tricycle landing gear and a four-cylinder, air-cooled, four-stroke, single-ignition 150 hp (112 kW) Subaru EJ22 auto-conversion engine in pusher configuration.

The aircraft fuselage is made from monocoque aluminum sheet, with a steel rotor mast and the twin tails supported by aluminium tubing. The series uses American-made Vortech and SportCopter rotor blades with a 9.14 m (30.0 ft) diameter and a chord of 20 cm (7.9 in). The 2004M model has an empty weight of 350 kg (772 lb) and a gross weight of 550 kg (1,213 lb), giving a useful load of 200 kg (441 lb).

== Variants ==
2004
Original version with a gross weight of 450 kg (992 lb), a fuselage length of 3.90 m (12.8 ft) and a cruise speed of 130 km/h (81 mph).
2004M
Stretched version with a fuselage length of 4.225 m (13.9 ft) and a cruise speed of 130 km/h (81 mph).
2008
Improved version with a gross weight of 450 kg (992 lb), a fuselage length of 4.225 m (13.9 ft) and a cruise speed of 150 km/h (93 mph).

== Specifications (2004M) ==
Data from Bayerl

General characteristics

- Crew: one
- Capacity: one passenger
- Empty weight: 350 kg (772 lb)
- Gross weight: 550 kg (1,213 lb)
- Fuel capacity: 70 litres (15 imp gal; 18 US gal)
- Powerplant: 1 × Subaru EJ22 four cylinder, air-cooled, four-stroke, single-ignition automotive engine, 110 kW (150 hp)
- Main rotor diameter: 9.14 m (30 ft 0 in)
- Propellers: 4-bladed composite

Performance

- Maximum speed: 150 km/h (93 mph, 81 kn)
- Cruise speed: 130 km/h (81 mph, 70 kn)
- Rate of climb: 5 m/s (980 ft/min)
