= Rotorfly R-30 =

Russian light coaxial helicopter

R30
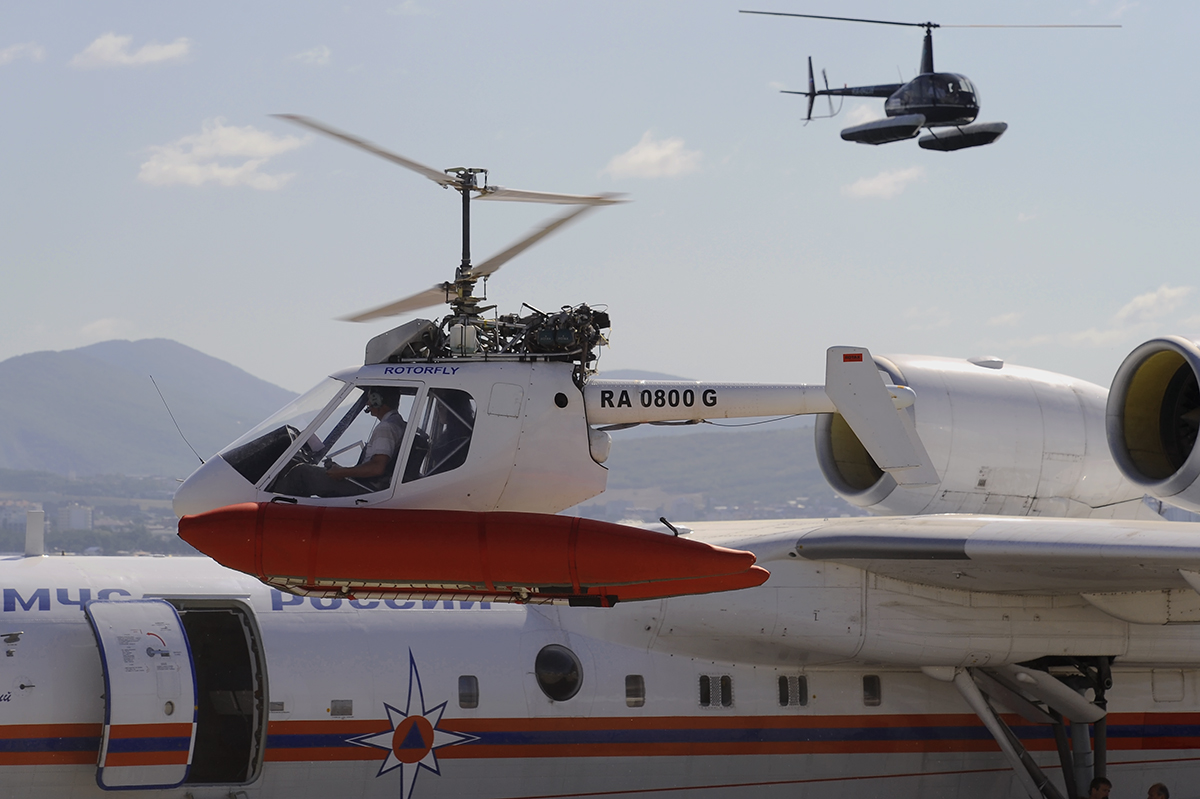

General information
- Type: Helicopter
- National origin: Russia
- Manufacturer: Rotor Fly LLC
- Designer: Victor Hribkov
- Number built: 4 (excluding prototype)

History
- First flight: 2005

Rotorfly R-30 - Russian tandem-seat coaxial helicopter manufactured by Rotorfly LLC, city of Kumertau Rotor Fly LLC. .

== History ==
The initial designer at Kumertau Rotor Fly LLC. was Victor Hribkov, the first flight was conducted in 2005 and the aircraft was presented at MAKS 2005 and was offered as a kit to build, as a result of stagnation in the sale the production was passed over to Kamov in 2008 which produced on custom order. The Rotorfly R-30 helicopter was presented at the Hydroaviasalon 2010 exhibitions, International Aviation and Space Salon MAKS 2011 from August 16 to 21. The production suspended that Rotor Fly LCC was acquired by a Chinese company.

== Design ==
The Rotorfly R-30 helicopter is a coaxial helicopter with two two-blade fiberglass rotors. The control rods of the upper main rotor are located inside the shaft which reduces turbulence, It has been described as a hingeless teetering blade mount. The aircraft claimed to be very quiet in general.

The aircraft has skid-type landing gear with removable wheels, a glass fiber soundproof cabin with an aluminium tube frame inside taken from Ptenets-2 making a tail and boom structure.

The Cobra 500 parachute rescue system is located under the tail boom behinder the engine, if activated the helicopter will tilt forward which will the helicopter on impact but save the crew

Both seats are located side by side and have traditional and digital flight controls although the left seat is closer to the instruments dashboard.

== Variants ==
=== Rotorfly R-33 ===
Improved cockpit

=== Rotirfly R-34 ===
Source:

=== Patrol-LA ===
Single seat military version.

=== Patrol-2-BLA ===
An unmanned version for military and civilian reconnaissance is being developed, the absence of the pilot will also increase the payload.

== Specifications ==
Data from

General characteristics

- Crew: one
- Capacity: one passenger
- Length: 5.3 m (17 ft 5 in)
- Width: 1.6 m (5 ft 3 in)
- Height: 2.6 m (8 ft 6 in)
- Empty weight: 250 kg (551 lb)
- Max takeoff weight: 490 kg (1,080 lb)
- Fuel Consumption: 15l/h
- Service life: ≈400 hours
- Powerplant: 1 × Rotax 912ULS piston engine, 75 kW (100 hp)
- Main rotor diameter: 2 × 6 m (19 ft 8 in)

Performance

- Maximum speed: 160 km/h (99 mph, 86 kn)
- Cruise speed: 90–130 km/h (56–81 mph, 49–70 kn)
- Range: 300–500 km (190–310 mi, 160–270 nmi)
- Service ceiling: 4,000 m (13,000 ft)

== Gallery ==
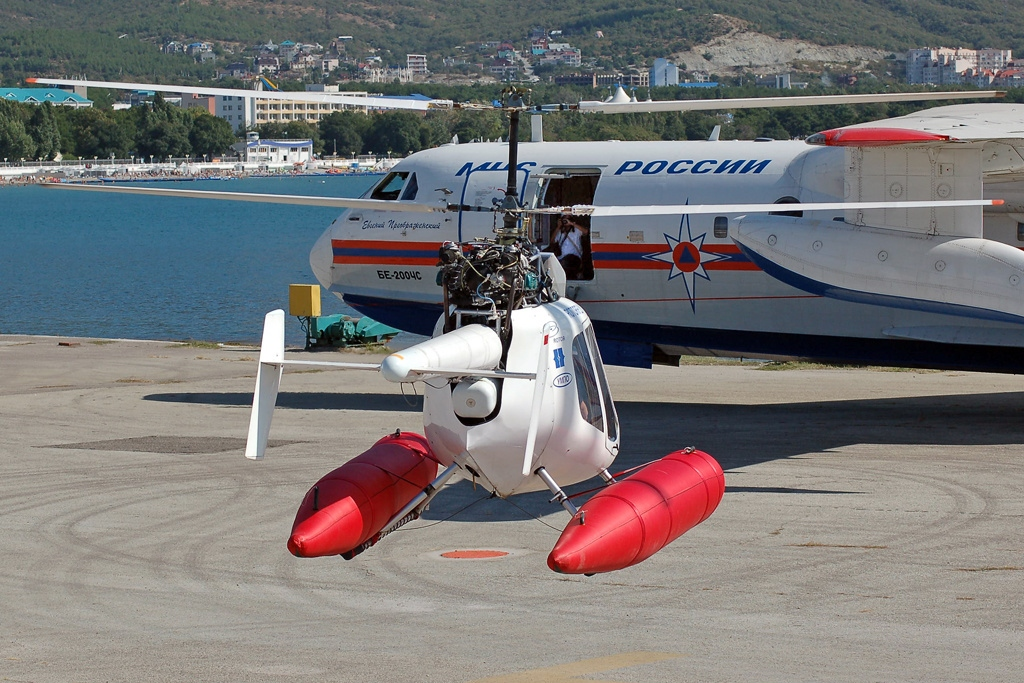

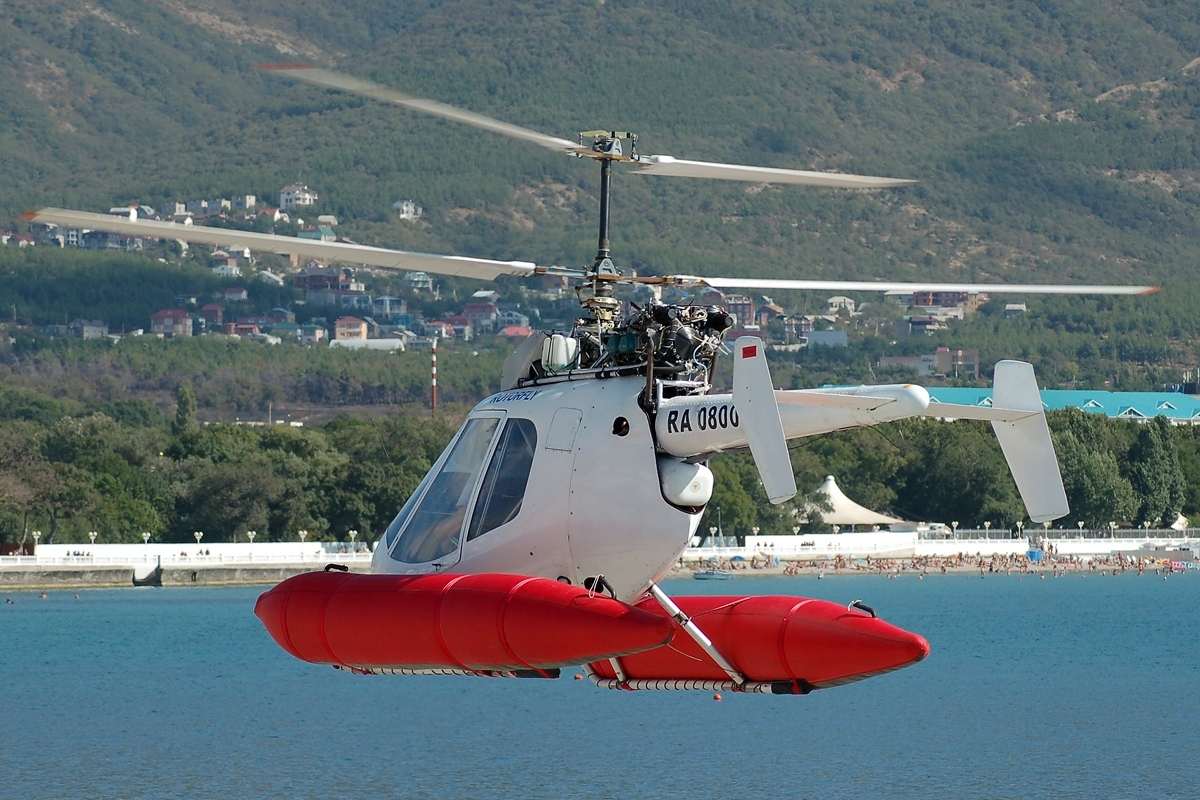

== See also ==
- EDM Aerotec CoAX 2D/2R
