= Niki Rotor Aviation =

Bulgarian aircraft manufacturer

- Company type: Privately held company
- Industry: Aerospace
- Headquarters: Pravets, Bulgaria
- Products: Autogyros
- Website: nikiaviation.com

Niki Rotor Aviation is a Bulgarian aircraft manufacturer based in Pravets. The company specializes in the design and manufacture of autogyros in the form of kits for amateur construction.

The company is noted for its elegant, enclosed cockpit designs and its use of US-made Vortech and Sport Copter rotor blades.

The Niki 2004 model was developed into the stretched Niki 2004M and later into the faster Niki 2008 and Niki Apis. The Niki Lightning, originally designated as the Niki 2009, and Niki Kallithea are tandem two seat models, the Kallithea with a low-mounted tailboom under the propeller and the Lightning with a propeller-hub mounted tailboom.

== Aircraft ==
Summary of aircraft built by Niki Rotor Aviation
| Model name | First flight | Number built | Type |
|---|---|---|---|
| Niki 2004 | | | Two seats in side-by-side configuration autogyro |
| Niki 2004M | | | Two seats in side-by-side configuration autogyro development of the 2004. |
| Niki Apis | | | Two seats in side-by-side configuration autogyro development of the 2004. |
| Niki 2008 | | | Two seats in side-by-side configuration autogyro development of the 2004. |
| Niki Lightning | | | Two seats in tandem autogyro. |
| Niki Kallithea | | | Two seats in tandem autogyro. |
