= Bilsam Sky Cruiser =

Polish microlight aircraft

Sky Cruiser

General information
- Type: Microlight, Advanced Ultra-Light Aeroplane and light sport aircraft
- National origin: Poland
- Manufacturer: Bilsam Aviation

History
- Introduction date: early 2000s
- Developed into: BOT SC07 Speed Cruiser

The Bilsam Sky Cruiser is a Polish microlight aircraft designed and produced by Bilsam Aviation of Poznań, introduced in the early 2000s. The aircraft is supplied as a complete ready-to-fly-aircraft, as a kit and in the form of plans for amateur construction.

The manufacturer's website is non-functional and has been so since about 2008, so it is not clear if the company is still in business.

== Design and development ==
The aircraft was designed to comply with the Fédération Aéronautique Internationale microlight category, including the category's maximum gross weight of 450 kg (992 lb). The aircraft has a maximum gross weight of 450 kg (992 lb). With a Rotax 912 ULS engine it is an accepted US light sport aircraft and also a Transport Canada accepted Advanced Ultra-Light Aeroplane.

Originally shown as a pusher configuration design in 2003, by 2004 the aircraft had been redesigned. In its production configuration the Sky Cruiser features a cantilever high-wing, a two-seats-in-side-by-side configuration enclosed cabin with doors for access, fixed tricycle landing gear with wheel pants and a single engine in tractor configuration.

The aircraft is made from composite material. Its 9.0 m (29.5 ft) span wing mounts flaps and has a wing area of 10.35 m^{2} (111.4 sq ft). The standard engine used is the 100 hp (75 kW) Suzuki automotive conversion powerplant.

The aircraft has a typical empty weight of 250 kg (550 lb) and a gross weight of 450 kg (990 lb), giving a useful load of 200 kg (440 lb). With full fuel of 60 litres (13 imp gal; 16 US gal) the payload for pilot, passenger and baggage is 157 kg (346 lb).

The Sky Cruiser was redesigned by BOT Aircraft as the BOT SC07 Speed Cruiser.

== Operational history ==
In June 2015 one example was registered in the United States with the Federal Aviation Administration and two in Canada registered with Transport Canada.

== Specifications (Sky Cruiser) ==
Data from Bertrand

General characteristics

- Crew: one
- Capacity: one passenger
- Wingspan: 9 m (29 ft 6 in)
- Wing area: 10.35 m^{2} (111.4 sq ft)
- Aspect ratio: 7.82:1
- Empty weight: 250 kg (551 lb)
- Gross weight: 450 kg (992 lb)
- Fuel capacity: 60 litres (13 imp gal; 16 US gal)
- Powerplant: 1 × Suzuki four cylinder, liquid-cooled, four stroke automotive engine, 75 kW (100 hp)
- Propellers: 3-bladed composite, ground adjustable

Performance

- Maximum speed: 240 km/h (150 mph, 130 kn)
- Cruise speed: 208 km/h (129 mph, 112 kn)
- Stall speed: 64 km/h (40 mph, 35 kn)
- Rate of climb: 4 m/s (790 ft/min)
- Wing loading: 43.5 kg/m^{2} (8.9 lb/sq ft)
