= BOT SC07 Speed Cruiser =

German ultralight aircraft

SC07 Speed Cruiser
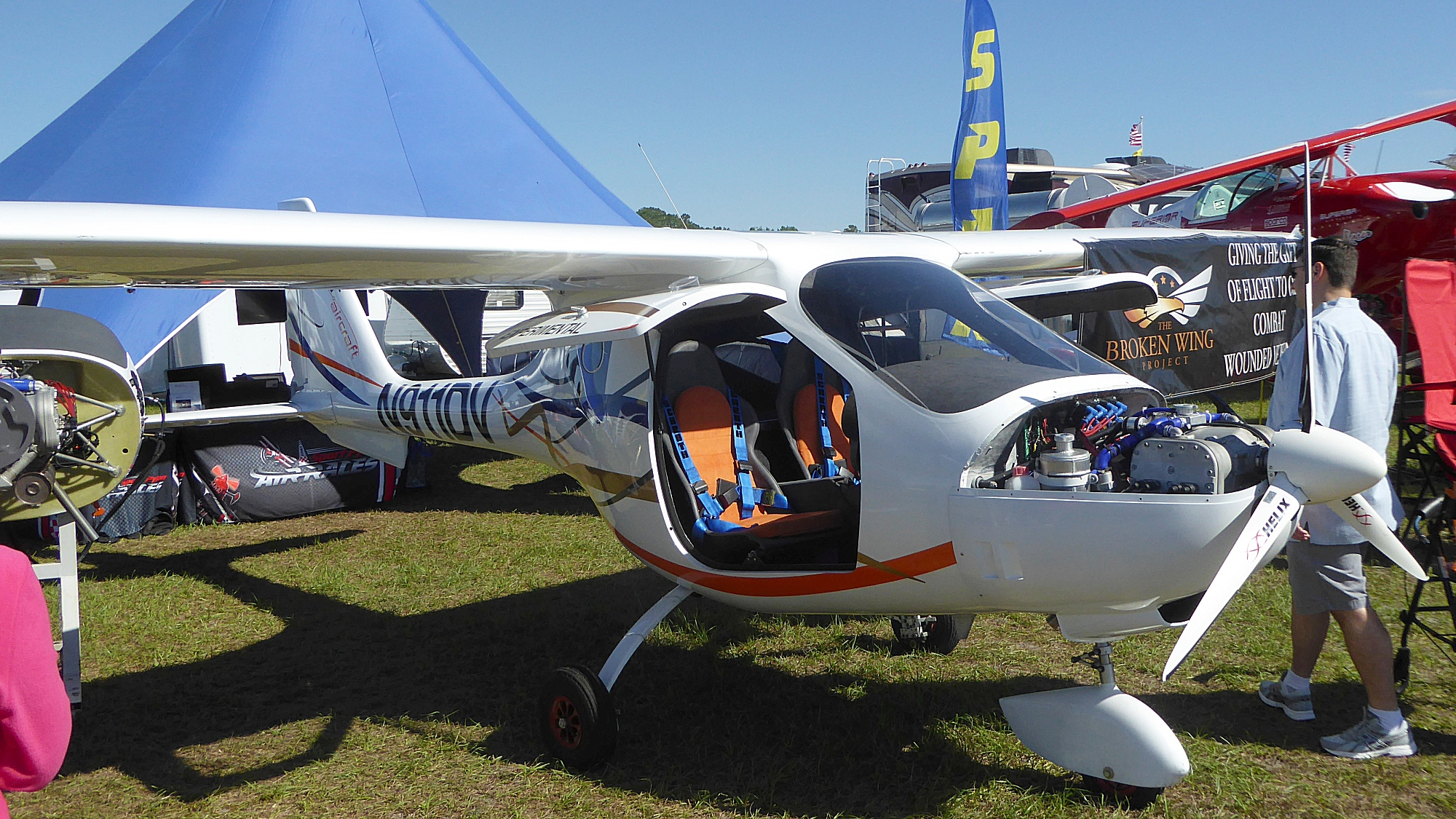

General information
- Type: Ultralight aircraft and Light-sport aircraft
- National origin: Germany
- Manufacturer: BOT Aircraft
- Status: In production

History
- Introduction date: 2009
- Developed from: Bilsam Sky Cruiser

The BOT SC07 Speed Cruiser is a German ultralight and light-sport aircraft, designed produced by BOT Aircraft of Oerlinghausen and introduced in 2009. The aircraft is supplied as a complete ready-to-fly-aircraft.

== Design and development ==
The SC07 was designed to comply with the Fédération Aéronautique Internationale microlight rules and US light-sport aircraft rules. It is a redesign of the Bilsam Sky Cruiser, featuring a cantilever high-wing, a two-seats-in-side-by-side configuration enclosed cockpit, fixed tricycle landing gear and a single engine in tractor configuration.

The aircraft structure is predominantly made from carbon fibre, with just part of the rudder made from fibreglass. Its 8.1 m (26.6 ft) span wing is also made from carbon fibre, covered with fibreglass and fits flaps. Standard engines available are the 100 hp (75 kW) Rotax 912ULS and the 91.8 hp (68 kW) D-Motor LF26 four-stroke powerplants.

The SC07 is capable of towing gliders and also operating on floats.

As of January 2017, the design does not appear on the Federal Aviation Administration's list of approved special light-sport aircraft.

== Operational history ==
In January 2017 there were two SC07s registered with the Federal Aviation Administration in the United States, one as Experimental - Exhibition and the other as unknown airworthiness.

== Specifications (SC07) ==
Data from Bayerl and BOT

General characteristics

- Crew: one
- Capacity: one passenger
- Length: 6.65 m (21 ft 10 in)
- Wingspan: 8.1 m (26 ft 7 in)
- Height: 2.10 m (6 ft 11 in)
- Wing area: 10.03 m^{2} (108.0 sq ft)
- Empty weight: 291 kg (642 lb)
- Gross weight: 472.5 kg (1,042 lb)
- Fuel capacity: 90 litres (20 imp gal; 24 US gal)
- Powerplant: 1 × Rotax 912ULS four cylinder, liquid and air-cooled, four stroke aircraft engine, 75 kW (101 hp)

Performance

- Maximum speed: 232 km/h (144 mph, 125 kn)
- Cruise speed: 215 km/h (134 mph, 116 kn)
- Stall speed: 64 km/h (40 mph, 35 kn)
- Never exceed speed: 250 km/h (160 mph, 130 kn)
- Range: 1,200 km (750 mi, 650 nmi)
- Rate of climb: 6.5 m/s (1,280 ft/min)
- Wing loading: 47.1 kg/m^{2} (9.6 lb/sq ft)
