= Bilsam Ultra Cruiser =

POlish microlight aircraft

Ultra Cruiser

General information
- Type: Microlight aircraft
- National origin: Poland
- Manufacturer: Bilsam Aviation

The Bilsam Ultra Cruiser is a family of Polish microlight aircraft designed and produced by Bilsam Aviation of Poznań, introduced in the 2000s. The aircraft is supplied as a complete ready-to-fly-aircraft, as a kit and in the form of plans for amateur construction.

The manufacturer's website is non-functional and has been so since about 2008, so it is not clear if the company is still in business.

== Design and development ==
The Ultra Cruiser was designed to comply with the Fédération Aéronautique Internationale microlight category, including the category's maximum gross weight of 450 kg (992 lb) and the US FAR 103 Ultralight Vehicles rules, including the category's maximum empty weight of 115 kg (254 lb).

The Ultra Cruiser I features a cantilever high-wing, a single-seat enclosed cockpit under a bubble canopy, fixed tricycle landing gear and a single engine in pusher configuration.

The aircraft is made from composite material. Its 8 m (26.2 ft) span wing has a wing area of 8 m^{2} (86 sq ft). The standard engines used are the 28 hp (21 kW) Hirth F-33 two-stroke or the Bilsam TNA 650 55 hp (41 kW) Suzuki automotive conversion powerplant.

The aircraft has a typical empty weight of 115 kg (254 lb) and a gross weight of 250 kg (550 lb), giving a useful load of 135 kg (298 lb). With full fuel of 19 litres (4.2 imp gal; 5.0 US gal) the payload for pilot and baggage is 121 kg (267 lb).

== Variants ==
Ultra Cruiser I
Single-seat version
Ultra Cruiser II
Two-seat version

== Specifications (Ultra Cruiser I) ==
Data from Bertrand

General characteristics

- Crew: one
- Wingspan: 8 m (26 ft 3 in)
- Wing area: 8 m^{2} (86 sq ft)
- Aspect ratio: 8:1
- Empty weight: 115 kg (254 lb)
- Gross weight: 250 kg (551 lb)
- Fuel capacity: 19 litres (4.2 imp gal; 5.0 US gal)
- Powerplant: 1 × Bilsam TNA 650 Suzuki air-cooled, four stroke automotive engine, 41 kW (55 hp)

Performance

- Maximum speed: 150 km/h (93 mph, 81 kn)
- Cruise speed: 100 km/h (62 mph, 54 kn)
- Stall speed: 56 km/h (35 mph, 30 kn)
- Rate of climb: 10 m/s (2,000 ft/min)
- Wing loading: 31.3 kg/m^{2} (6.4 lb/sq ft)
