= Foxcon Aviation =

Australian kit aircraft manufacturer

Foxcon Aviation & Research Pty Ltd
- Type: Privately held company
- Industry: Aerospace
- Founded: 1995
- Headquarters: Mackay, Queensland, Australia
- Products: Kit aircraft
- Website: www.foxcon.com

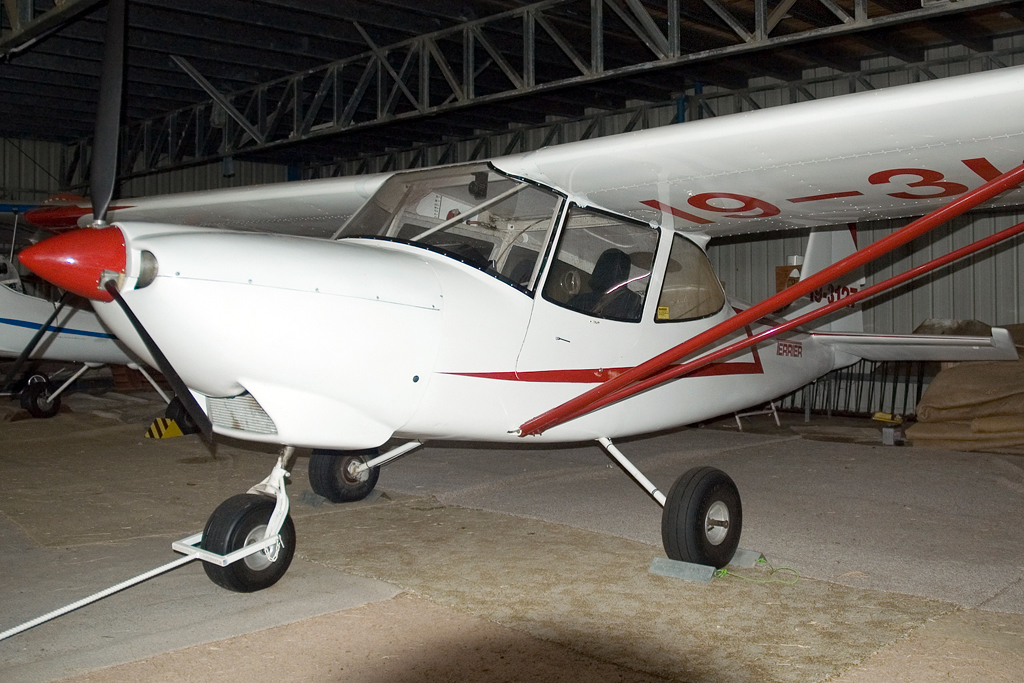
Foxcon Terrier 100

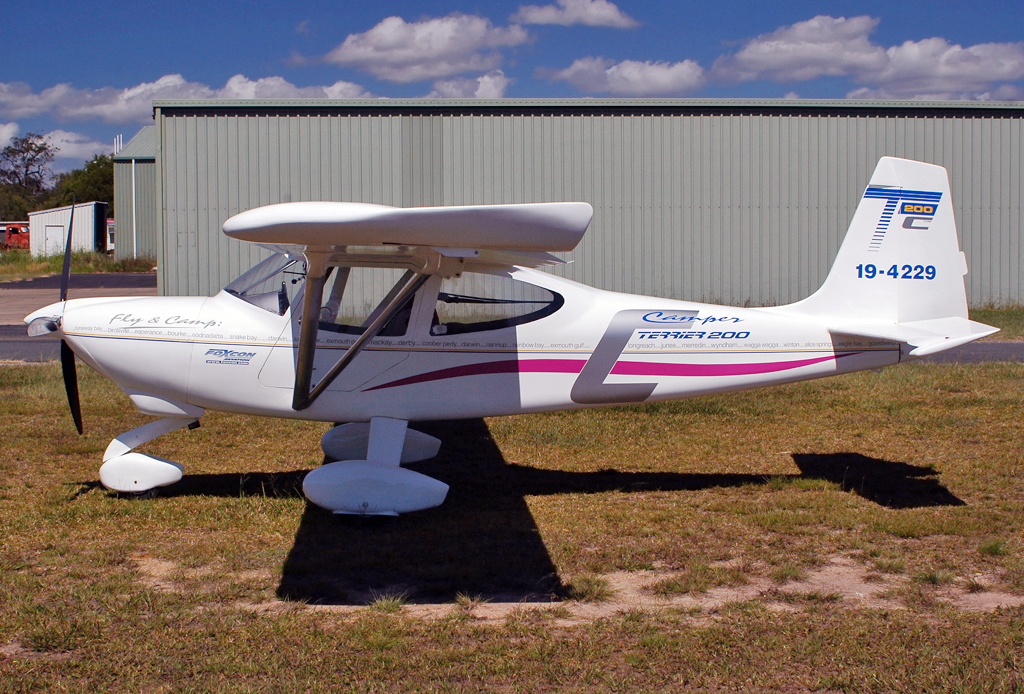
Foxcon Terrier 200

Foxcon Aviation & Research Pty Ltd, (usually just Foxcon Aviation) is an Australian aircraft manufacturer based in Mackay, Queensland that was founded in 1995. The company specialises in the design and manufacture of light aircraft in the form of kits for amateur construction and ready-to-fly aircraft.

The company was formed "to manufacture extremely competitive high performance light aircraft at an affordable price." Working in composite materials, the company has expanded its space over the years and added a climate-controlled vacuum bag molding capability, plus sandwich construction molding jigs.

Although the Foxcon Terrier 100 was at one time produced, the company's sole current product is the Foxcon Terrier 200, powered by a Subaru EA81 automotive conversion engine or Rotax 912ULS aircraft engine, although a four-seat Foxcon Terrier 400 is under development.

== Aircraft ==
Summary of aircraft built by Foxcon Aviation
Model name	First flight	Number built	Type
Foxcon Terrier 100			Two-seat homebuilt composite aircraft
Foxcon Terrier 200			Two-seat homebuilt composite aircraft
Foxcon Terrier 400			Proposed four-seat homebuilt composite aircraft
