= Deerlijk =

- Municipality
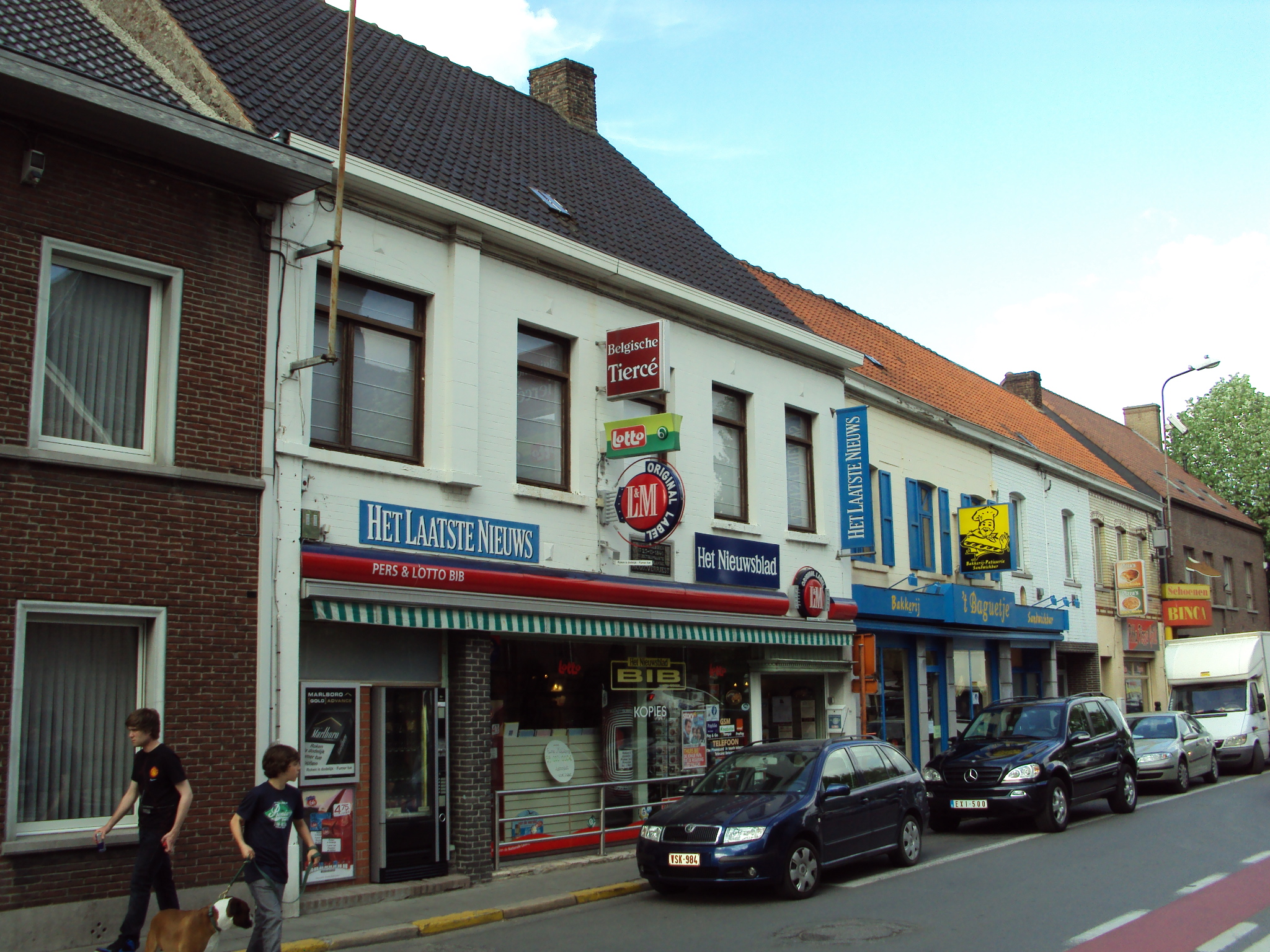

- Flag Coat of arms

- Location of Deerlijk in West-Flanders
- Interactive map of Deerlijk
- Location in Belgium
- Coordinates: 50°51′N 03°21′E
- Country: Belgium
- Community: Flemish Community
- Region: Flemish Region
- Province: West Flanders
- Arrondissement: Kortrijk

Government
  - Mayor: Louis Vanderbeken (CD&V)
  - Governing party: CD&V

Area
  - Total: 16.97 km^{2} (6.55 sq mi)

Population (2018-01-01)
  - Total: 11,796
  - Density: 695.1/km^{2} (1,800/sq mi)
- Postal codes: 8540
- NIS code: 34009
- Area codes: 056
- Website: www.deerlijk.be

Deerlijk (Dutch pronunciation: [ˈdeːrlək]; West Flemish: Deirlyk) is a municipality located in the Belgian province of West Flanders. The municipality only comprises the town of Deerlijk proper. On January 1, 2006, Deerlijk had a total population of 11,310. The total area is 16.82 km² which gives a population density of 673 inhabitants per km².

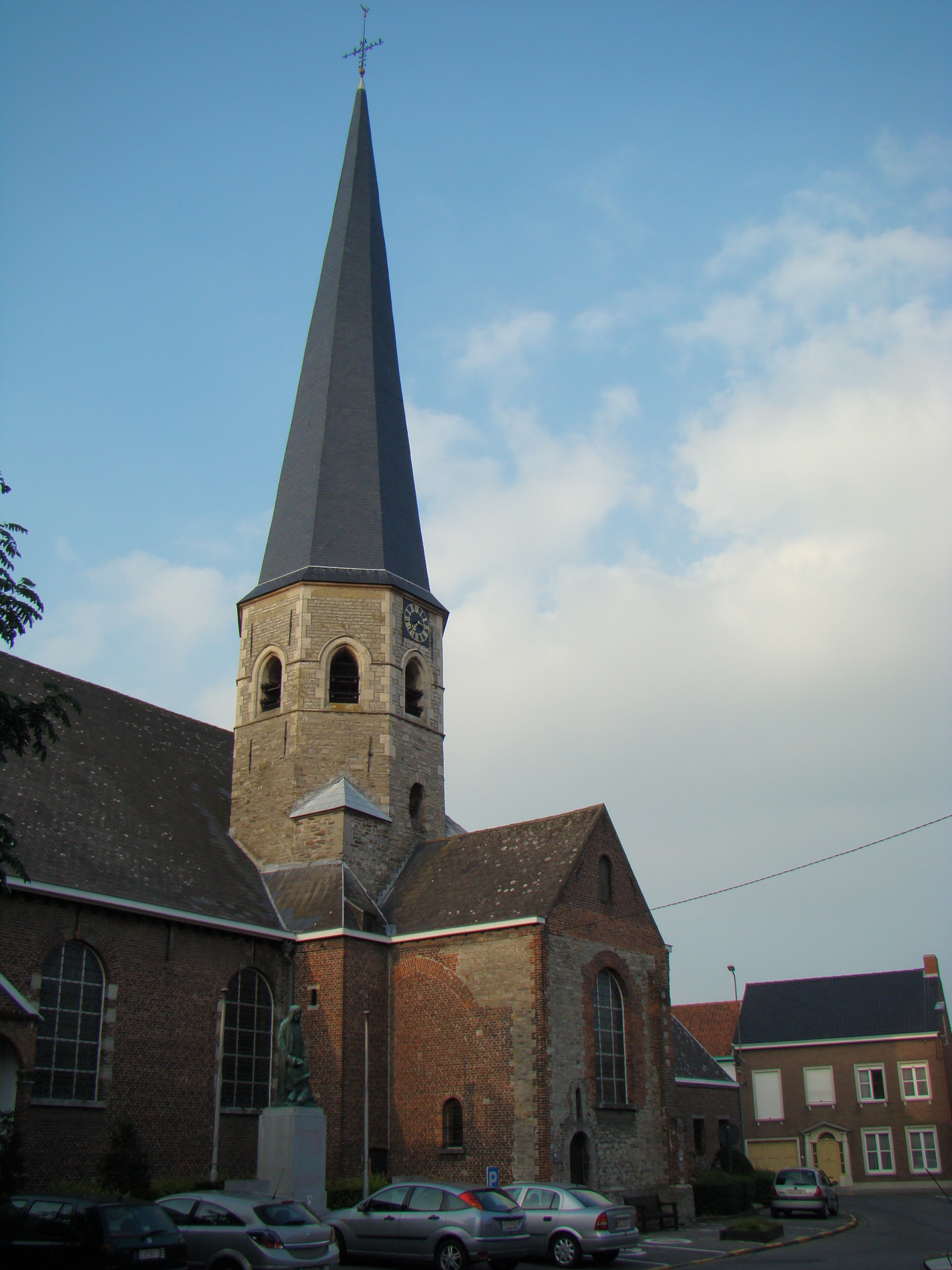
Sint-Columba church in Deerlijk

== Politics ==
In February 2026, mayor Louis Vanderbeken confirmed that Deerlijk would refuse to participate in the Flemish government's voluntary municipal merger plan, stating that the municipality is financially self-sufficient and prefers targeted inter-municipal cooperation over centralization.

In June 2026, the municipality joined forces with neighboring Harelbeke and Lendelede to legally challenge the environmental permits for the Ventilus high-voltage grid project, citing health concerns, a lack of financial compensation for affected residents along existing lines, and insufficient research into underground alternatives.
