= Russian Gyroplanes =

Russian gyroplane manufacturer

Russian Gyroplanes Limited
- Company type: Privately held company
- Industry: Aerospace
- Founded: 2007
- Headquarters: Zhukovsky, Moscow Oblast, Russia
- Products: Hovercraft, autogyros
- Website: www.gyros.su

Russian Gyroplanes (Russian: Гиропланы России) is a Russian aircraft manufacturer based in Zhukovsky, Moscow Oblast. The company specializes in the design and manufacture of autogyros in the form of ready-to-fly aircraft, as well as and hovercraft. The company was founded in 2007.

The company has two autogyros in their product line, the single-seat Gyros-1 Farmer and the two-seat Gyros-2 Smartflier, both aimed at the aerial work market, with roles including aerial application, courier, forestry patrol, search and rescue, geological survey, air taxi and flight training.

The company has also developed a two-seat hovercraft design, the Gerris, powered by a German Hirth 3701ES two-stroke aircraft engine and capable of 130 km/h (81 mph).

There is a different design ethos between Russian and European autogyro designs: Europeans are sleek and lightweight, with modest size engines using pusher propellers (or ducted fans); Russian gyroplanes are by contrast agricultural and heavy-duty, with large engines driving tractor propellers.

== Aircraft ==
Summary of vehicles built by Russian Gyroplanes:

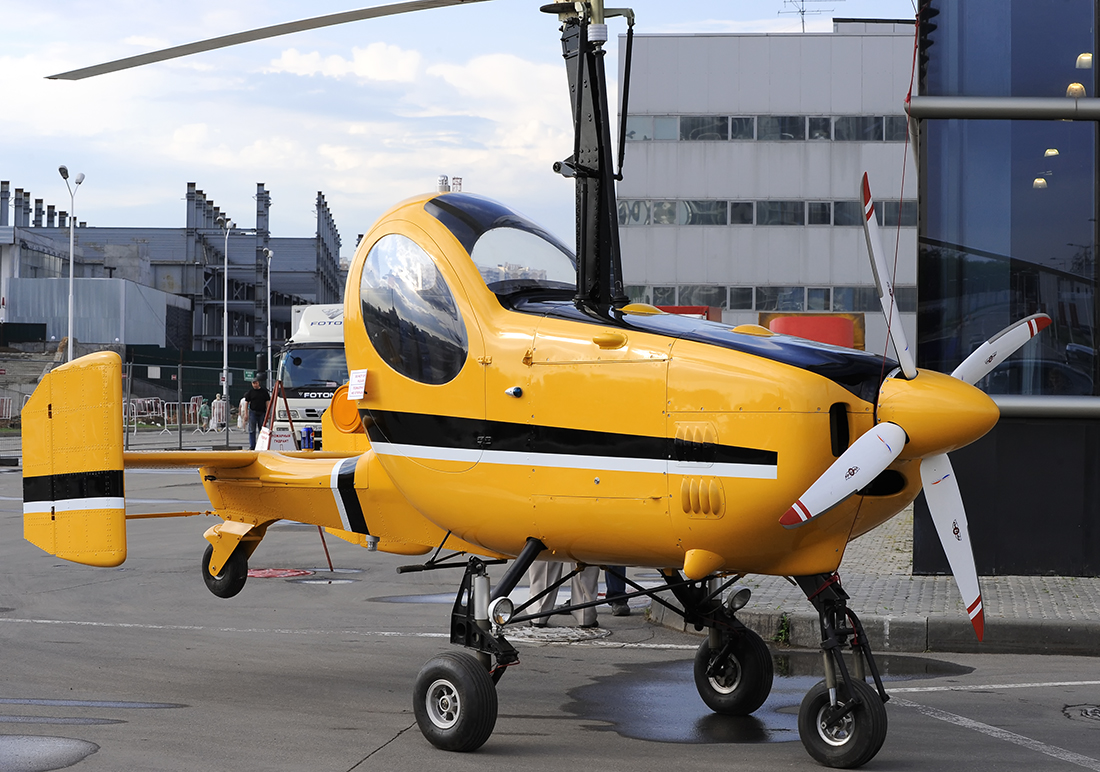
Russian Gyroplanes Gyros-1 Farmer

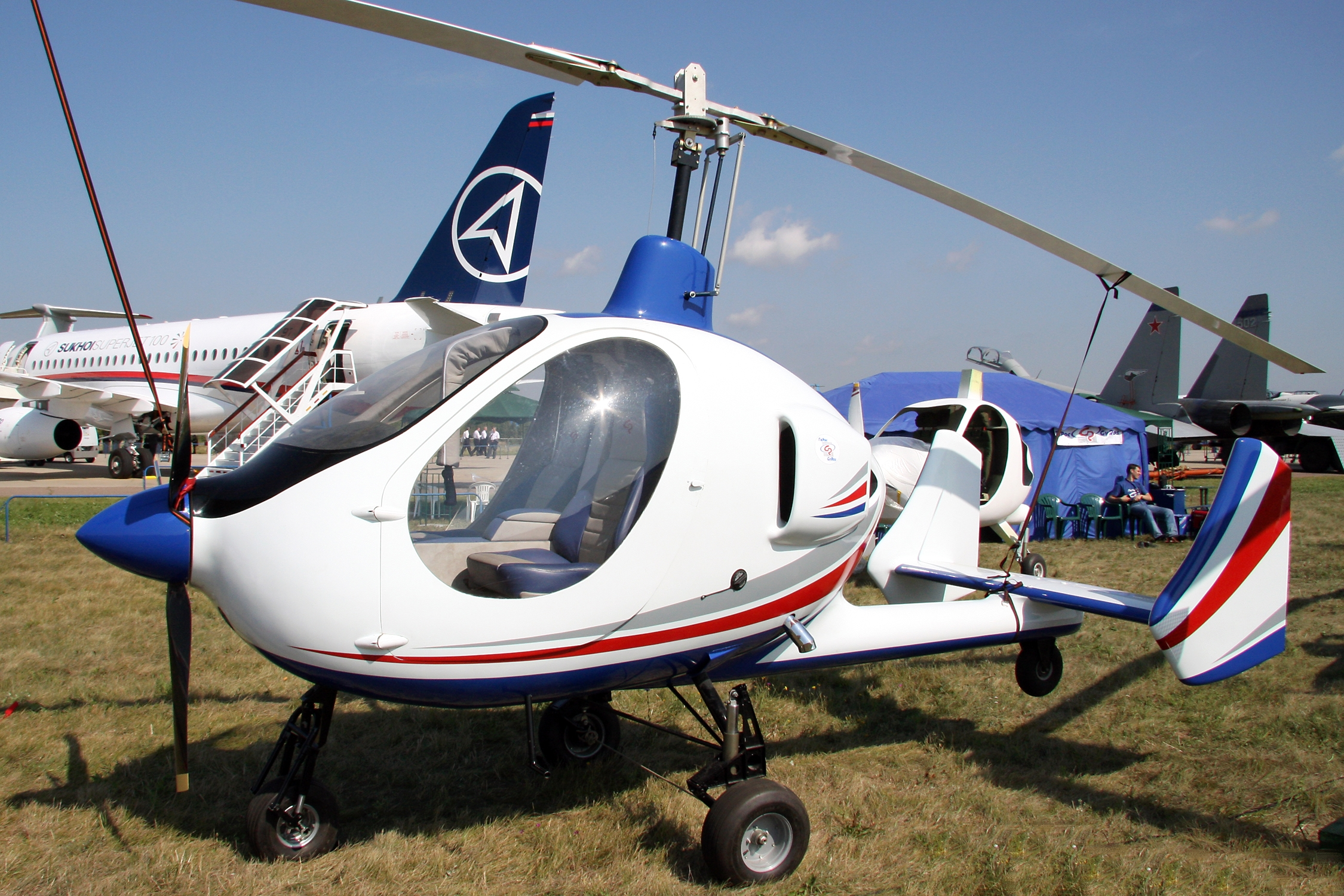
Russian Gyroplanes Gyros-2 Smartflier

Autogyros

- Russian Gyroplanes Gyros-1 Farmer
- Russian Gyroplanes Gyros-2 Smartflier

Hovercraft

- Russian Gyroplanes Gerris

== European competitors ==
- AutoGyro Cavalon
- AutoGyro Calidus
- RotorSport UK Calidus
- Niki Lightning
- Niki Kallithea
- Sport Copter Lightning
