= MT-03 =

MT-03 may refer to:

- AutoGyro MT-03, a German autogyro
- RotorSport UK MT-03, a British autogyro
- Yamaha MT-03, a Japanese motorcycle
