= AutoGyro GmbH =

German aircraft manufacturer

- Company type: Privately held company
- Industry: Aerospace
- Headquarters: Hildesheim, Lower Saxony, Germany
- Products: Autogyros
- Website: www.auto-gyro.com

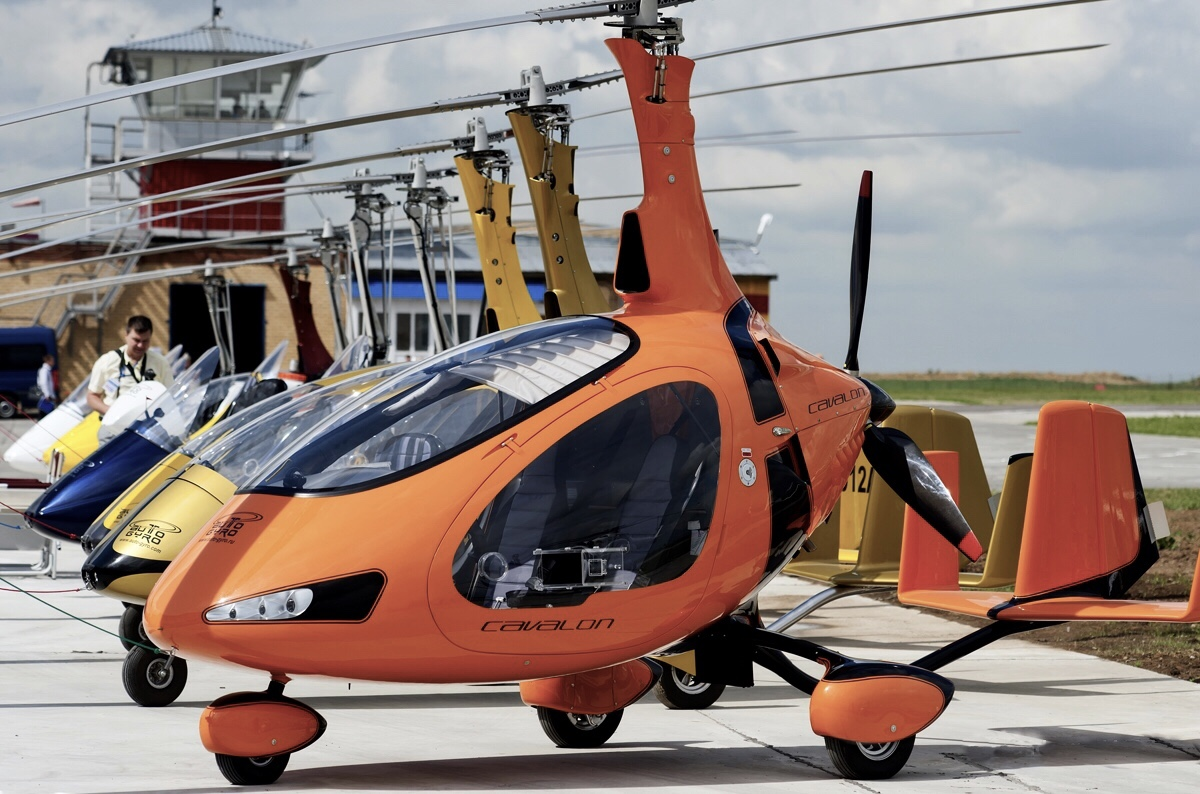
AutoGyro Cavalons

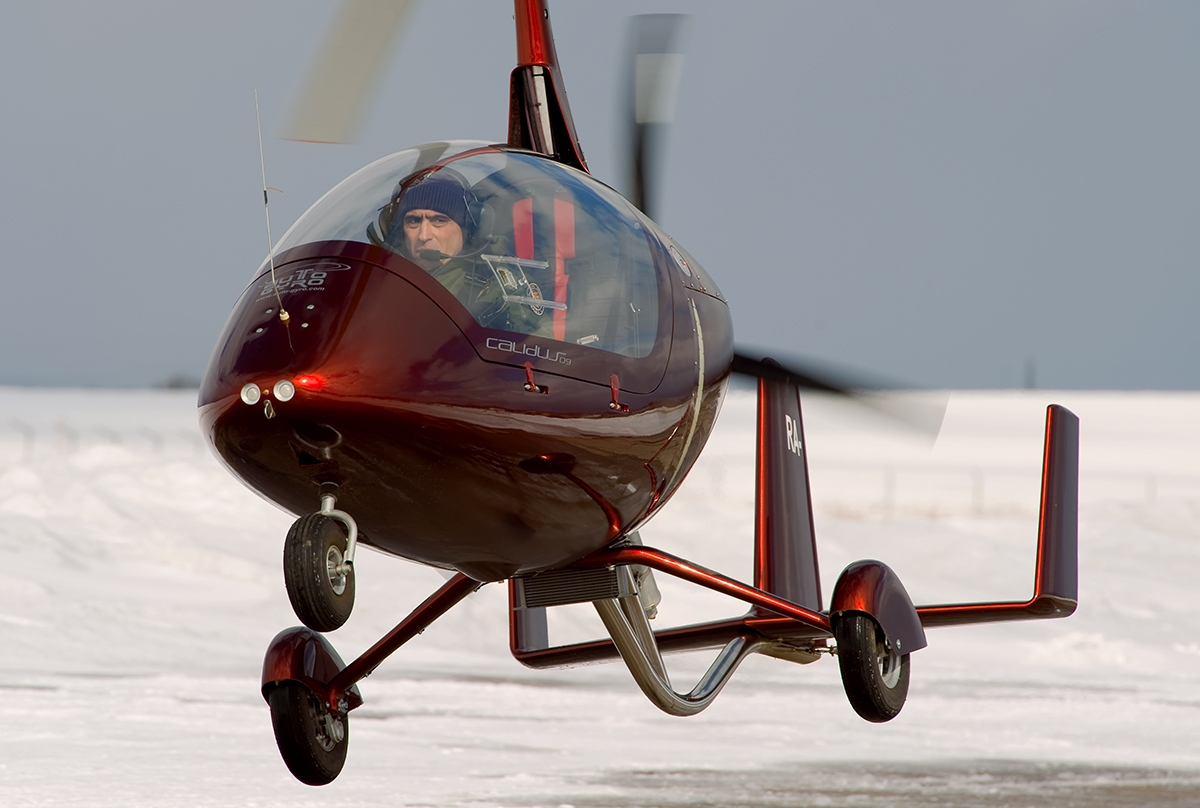
AutoGyro Calidus

AutoGyro GmbH (English: AutoGyro Limited) is a German aircraft manufacturer based in Hildesheim. The company specializes in the design and manufacture of autogyros in the form of fully assembled, ready to fly aircraft.

The company has had commercial success with their designs, which include a mast-mounted vibration dampening system. The enclosed cabin AutoGyro Cavalon and AutoGyro Calidus are noted for their very aerodynamically clean fuselage fairings. The open cockpit AutoGyro MT-03 is described as a "market leader" and is sold in the UK as the modified RotorSport UK MT-03. The AutoGyro MTOsport is a development version of the MT-03. British importer RotorSport UK also markets a modified version of the Calidus as the RotorSport UK Calidus. As of 2014, they build around 300 aircraft per year.

An MT-03 was flown on a world record-setting distance flight in Australia of 1,263 km (785 mi).

In 2013 the company produced the world's first electric aircraft autogyro, the eCavalon

== Aircraft ==
Summary of aircraft built by AutoGyro GmbH
Model name	First flight	Number built	Type
AutoGyro MT-03			Two seat tandem open cockpit autogyro
AutoGyro MTOsport			Two seat tandem open cockpit autogyro
AutoGyro Calidus			Two seat tandem enclosed cockpit autogyro
AutoGyro Cavalon			Two seat side-by-side configuration enclosed cockpit autogyro
AutoGyro eCavalon	2013		Two seat enclosed cockpit electric-powered autogyro
