= Winds Italia =

Italian aircraft manufacturer

- Company type: Privately held company
- Industry: Aerospace
- Founded: c. 2001
- Founder: Randy Haney
- Defunct: c. 2008
- Headquarters: Bologna, Italy
- Products: Paramotors

Winds Italia (English: Italian Winds) was an Italian aircraft manufacturer based in Bologna that was founded by Canadian hang glider champion pilot Randy Haney. The company specialized in the design and manufacture of paramotors and powered hang glider harnesses in the form of ready-to-fly aircraft for the US FAR 103 Ultralight Vehicles rules and the European microlight category.

The company seems to have been founded about 2001 and gone out of business in 2008, when production of its two models was passed to Flugsport Vetterl GmbH und Co. KG of Schwarzenfeld, Germany.

Winds Italia built a powered hang glider harness, the Raven, employing the single cylinder Radne Raket 120 engine of 15 hp (11 kW). The company produced the Airwalker paramotor and later the Orbiter series, introduced in 2003 and which replaced the Airwalker in production. The Orbiter offered both the Raket engine and the higher-powered Orbiter XP model with a 24 hp (18 kW) Cors'Air M21Y engine.

== Aircraft ==
Summary of aircraft built by Winds Italia
Model name	First flight	Number built	Type
Winds Italia Raven	2001		powered hang glider harness
Winds Italia Airwalker	2001		paramotor
Winds Italia Orbiter	2003		paramotor
