= Winds Italia Orbiter =

Italian paramotor

Orbiter

General information
- Type: Paramotor
- National origin: Italy
- Manufacturer: Winds Italia
- Designer: Randy Haney
- Status: Production completed

The Winds Italia Orbiter is a family of Italian paramotors that were designed by Randy Haney and produced by his company Winds Italia of Bologna for powered paragliding. Now out of production, when the series was available the aircraft were supplied complete and ready-to-fly.

== Design and development ==
The Orbiter series was designed to comply with the US FAR 103 Ultralight Vehicles rules as well as European regulations. They feature a paraglider-style wing, single-place accommodation and a single engine in pusher configuration with a reduction drive and a 130 cm (51 in) diameter two-bladed wooden propeller. The fuel tank capacity is 5 litres (1.1 imp gal; 1.3 US gal).

As is the case with all paramotors, take-off and landing is accomplished by foot. Inflight steering is accomplished via handles that actuate the canopy brakes, creating roll and yaw.

Reviewer Rene Coulon noted the Orbiter's design for both its aesthetics and robustness.

== Variants ==
Orbiter
Model with a 14.5 hp (11 kW) Radne Raket 120 engine in pusher configuration with a 3.54:1 ratio reduction drive and a 130 cm (51 in) diameter two-bladed wooden propeller.
Orbiter XP
Higher powered model with a 24 hp (18 kW) Cors'Air M21Y engine in pusher configuration with a 1.9:1 ratio reduction drive and a two-bladed wooden propeller. Other reduction ratios were factory available as options. The XP was supplied without an electric starter or battery to save weight. The resulting unit empty weight was 27 kg (60 lb).

== Specifications (Orbiter) ==
Data from Bertrand

General characteristics

- Crew: one
- Empty weight: 21 kg (46 lb) propulsion unit and harness only
- Fuel capacity: 5 litres (1.1 imp gal; 1.3 US gal)
- Powerplant: 1 × Radne Raket 120 single cylinder, two-stroke, air-cooled aircraft engine, with a 3.54:1 reduction drive, 10.8 kW (14.5 hp)
- Propellers: 2-bladed wooden, fixed pitch, 1.30 m (4 ft 3 in) diameter

== See also ==
- Winds Italia Raven - a powered hang glider design from the same manufacturer
