= Eggenfellner Aircraft =

American aircraft engine manufacturer

Eggenfellner Aircraft Inc
- Company type: Privately held company
- Industry: Aerospace
- Founded: 1994
- Defunct: 2009
- Fate: Bankrupt
- Headquarters: Edgewater, Volusia County, Florida, United States
- Products: Aircraft engines
- Owner: Jan Eggenfellner

Eggenfellner Aircraft Inc was an American aircraft engine manufacturer, founded by Jan Eggenfellner and based in Edgewater, Volusia County, Florida. The company specialized in the design and manufacture of engines for homebuilt aircraft.

== History ==
The company was founded in 1994 to produce the Eggenfellner E6 series of Subaru-based engines and went bankrupt in 2009 in the Great Recession. Eggenfellner indicated that low profit margins and more market emphasis on lower-powered engines precipitated the bankruptcy. Eggenfellner said, "some customers lost money and became upset, blaming me personally for the losses. I personally lost everything, providing refunds, until no money was left."

The company's engines found a high degree of customer acceptance among owners of Van's Aircraft types, due to the completeness of the package provided and the low price. In 2003 it was reported that 298 engines had been sold to RV builders.

In 2010 Eggenfellner founded a new company to produce the Viking 110 light-sport aircraft engine, Viking Aircraft Engines.

== Aircraft engines ==
Summary of aircraft engines built by Eggenfellner Aircraft
Model name	First run	Type
Eggenfellner E6	1994	Subaru-based six-cylinder, liquid-cooled engine
