= Winds Italia Raven =

Italian powered hang glider

Raven

General information
- Type: Powered hang glider
- National origin: Italy
- Manufacturer: Winds Italia
- Designer: Randy Haney
- Status: Production completed

The Winds Italia Raven is an Italian powered hang glider that was designed by champion hang glider pilot Randy Haney and produced by his company Winds Italia of Bologna. Now out of production, when it was available the aircraft was supplied complete and ready-to-fly.

== Design and development ==
The Raven features a cable-braced hang glider-style high-wing, weight-shift controls, single-place accommodation, foot-launching and landing and a single engine in pusher configuration.

The aircraft uses a standard hang glider wing, made from bolted-together aluminum tubing, with its single surface wing covered in Dacron sailcloth. The wing is supported by a single tube-type kingpost and uses an "A" frame control bar. The engine is a two-stroke, single cylinder Radne Raket 120 of 15 hp (11 kW) powering the 132 cm (52 in) diameter propeller through a 3.54:1 reduction drive. The harness mounts the engine and the 5 litres (1.1 imp gal; 1.3 US gal) fuel tank. Dual retractable small wheels are provided to protect the propeller during take-off and landing. Electric starting and a folding propeller are standard features.

== Specifications (Raven) ==
Data from Bertrand

General characteristics

- Crew: one
- Empty weight: 21.9 kg (48 lb) harness and engine only
- Fuel capacity: 5 litres (1.1 imp gal; 1.3 US gal)
- Powerplant: 1 × Radne Raket 120 single cylinder, air-cooled aircraft engine with a 3.54:1 reduction drive, 11 kW (15 hp)
- Propellers: 2-bladed folding, 1.32 m (4 ft 4 in) diameter

== See also ==
- Winds Italia Orbiter - a paramotor design from the same manufacturer
