= Russian Gyroplanes Gyros-2 Smartflier =

Russian gyroplane

Gyros-2 Smartflier
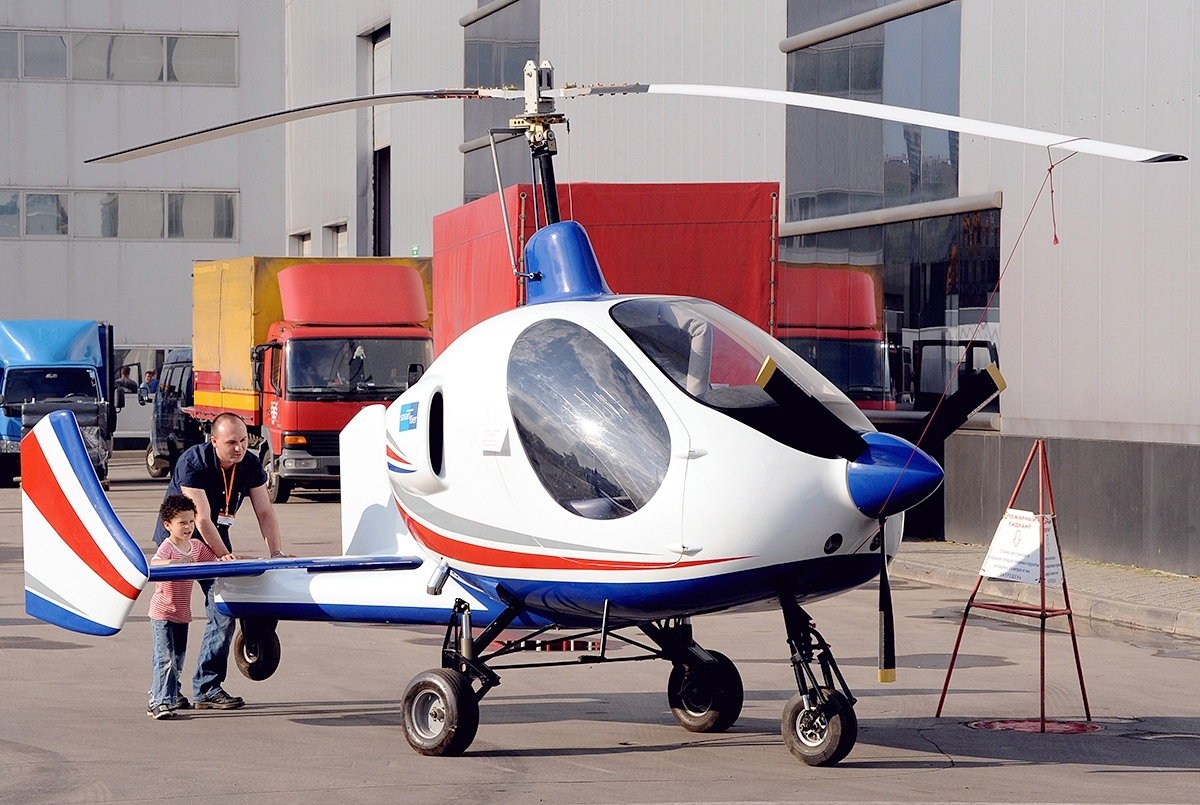

General information
- Type: Autogyro
- National origin: Russia
- Manufacturer: Russian Gyroplanes
- Status: In production (2017)

The Russian Gyroplanes Gyros-2 Smartflier is a Russian autogyro designed and produced by Russian Gyroplanes of Zhukovsky, Moscow Oblast. The aircraft is supplied complete and ready-to-fly.

== Design and development ==
The Gyros-2 was designed for a variety of roles, including aerial application, courier, forestry patrol, search and rescue, geological survey, air taxi and flight training. It features a single main rotor, a two seats in side-by-side configuration enclosed cockpit accessed by doors, tricycle landing gear, plus a tailwheel and a 200 hp (149 kW) Mistral 200 engine in tractor configuration.

The aircraft also fits an optional Racket 120 single-cylinder, two-stroke auxiliary engine for running the agricultural equipment, when it is installed.

The aircraft has a two-bladed rotor and a three or six-bladed tractor propeller. The aircraft has a typical empty weight of 610 kg (1,345 lb) and a gross weight of 750 kg (1,653 lb), giving a useful load of 140 kg (309 lb). With full fuel of 100 litres (22 imp gal; 26 US gal) the payload for the pilot and payload is 68 kg (150 lb).

== Specifications (Gyros-2) ==
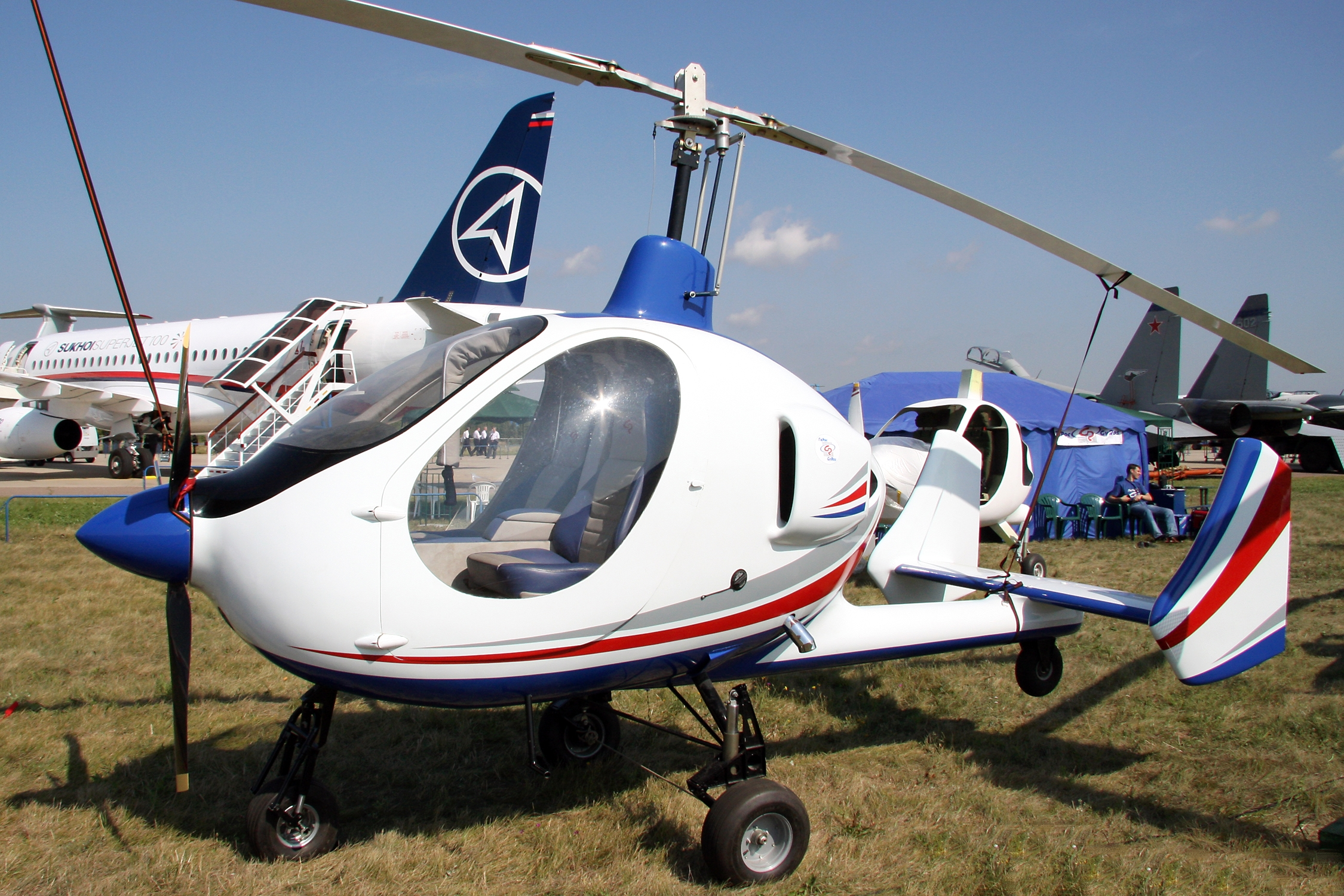
Gyros-2 Smartflier

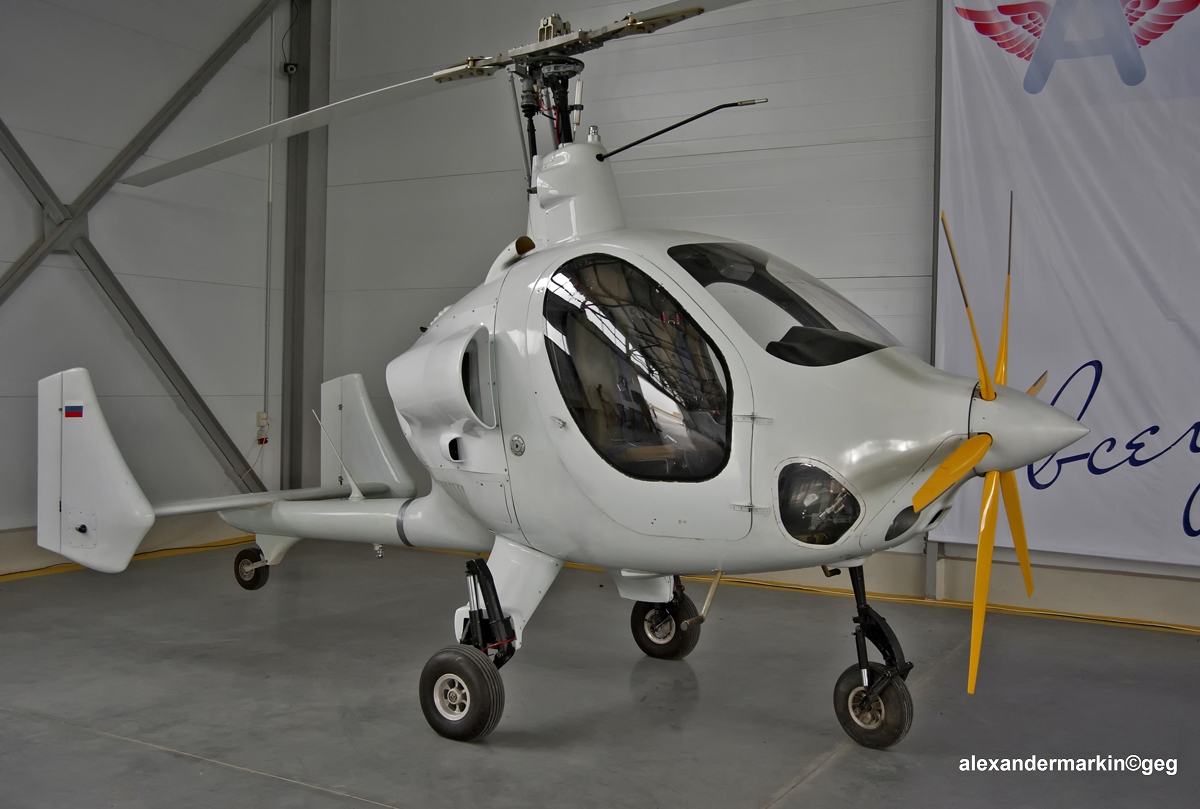
Gyros-2 Smartflier with six-bladed propeller

Data from Tacke and manufacturer

General characteristics

- Crew: one
- Capacity: one passenger
- Empty weight: 610 kg (1,345 lb)
- Gross weight: 750 kg (1,653 lb)
- Fuel capacity: 100 litres (22 imp gal; 26 US gal)
- Powerplant: 1 × Mistral 200 gasoline engine, 150 kW (200 hp)
- Powerplant: 1 × Racket 120 auxiliary power single cylinder, two-stroke, air-cooled, gasoline engine, 10 kW (13 hp)
- Propellers: 3-bladed ground adjustable

Performance

- Cruise speed: 130 km/h (81 mph, 70 kn)
- Range: 800 km (500 mi, 430 nmi)
- Rate of climb: 3.1 m/s (610 ft/min)

== See also ==
- List of rotorcraft
- Russian Gyroplanes Gyros-1 Farmer
