= AutoGyro MT-03 =

German autogyro

MT-03
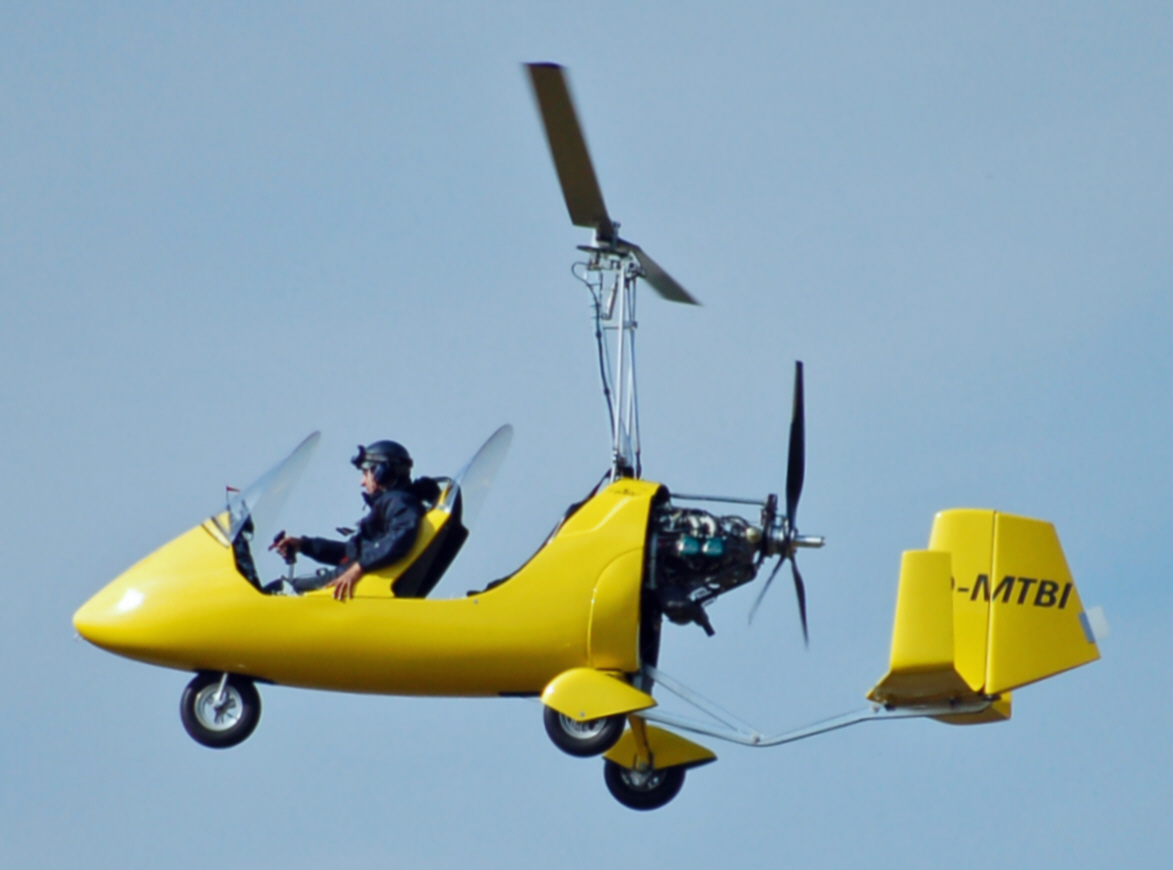
- AutoGyro MT-03

General information
- Type: Autogyro
- National origin: Germany
- Manufacturer: AutoGyro GmbH
- Status: In production (MTOsport, 2012)

History
- Variant: RotorSport UK MT-03

The AutoGyro MT-03 is a German autogyro, designed and produced by AutoGyro GmbH of Hildesheim. The aircraft is supplied as a complete ready-to-fly-aircraft.

The MT-03 was approved in the United Kingdom in 2007 in a modified form as the RotorSport UK MT-03.

== Design and development ==
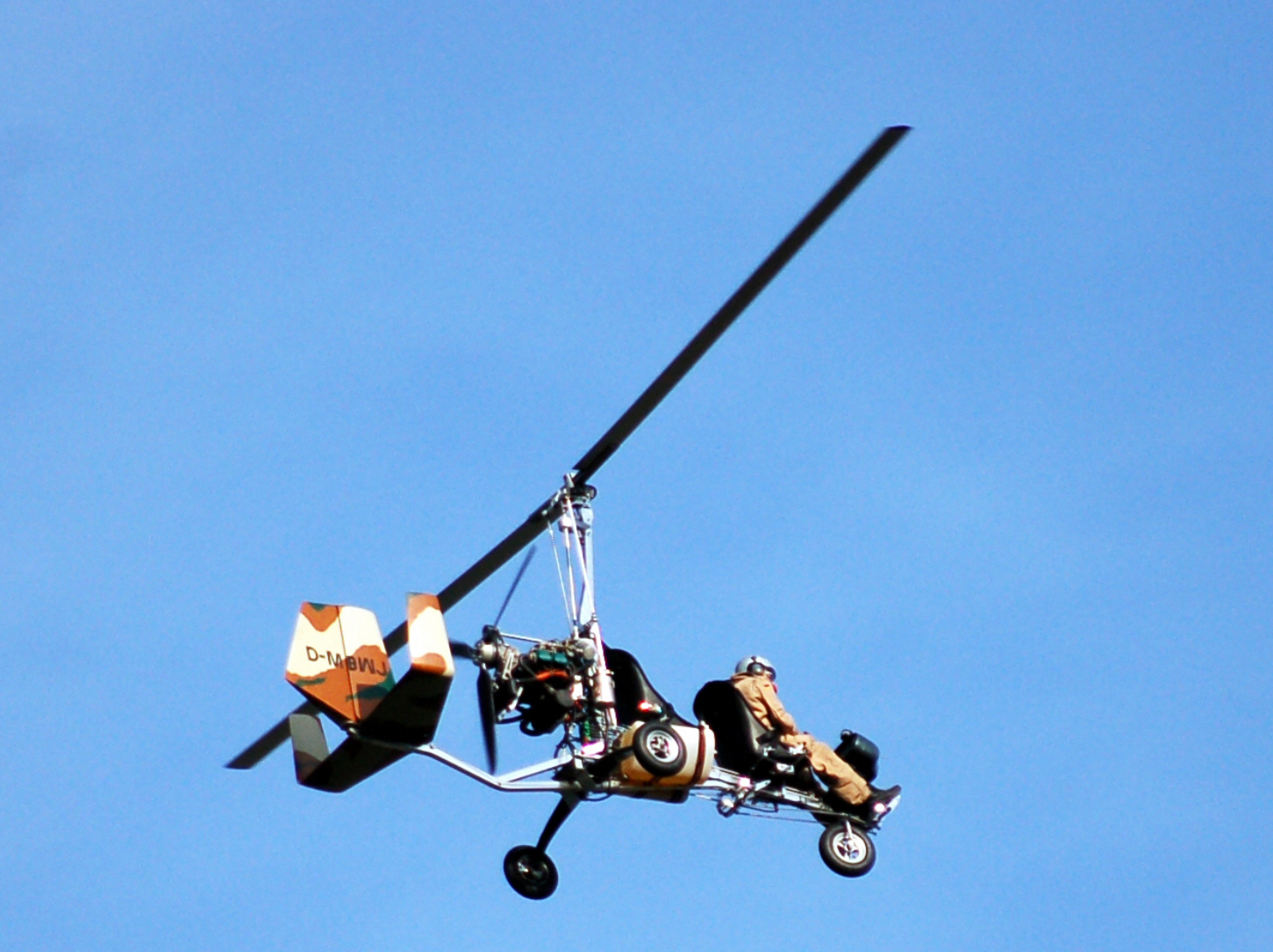
AutoGyro MT-03 without fairing fitted

The MT-03 features a single main rotor, a two-seats in tandem open cockpit with an optional partial cockpit fairing, tricycle landing gear with wheel pants and a four-cylinder, air and liquid-cooled, four-stroke, dual-ignition 100 hp (75 kW) Rotax 912 engine or turbocharged 115 hp (86 kW) Rotax 914 engine in pusher configuration.

The aircraft fairing is made from composites. Its 8.4 m (27.6 ft) diameter rotor has a chord of 20 cm (7.9 in). The aircraft has an empty weight of 245 kg (540 lb) and a gross weight of 450 kg (990 lb), giving a useful load of 205 kg (452 lb).

The MT-03 was developed into the MTOsport and the fully enclosed AutoGyro Calidus.

== Operational history ==
The MT-03 was flown on a world record-setting distance flight in Australia of 1,263 km (785 mi).

An AutoGyro MT-03 was used by Norman Surplus in his nine-year global circumnavigation that ended in 2019; the first to be done in an autogyro.

== Variants ==
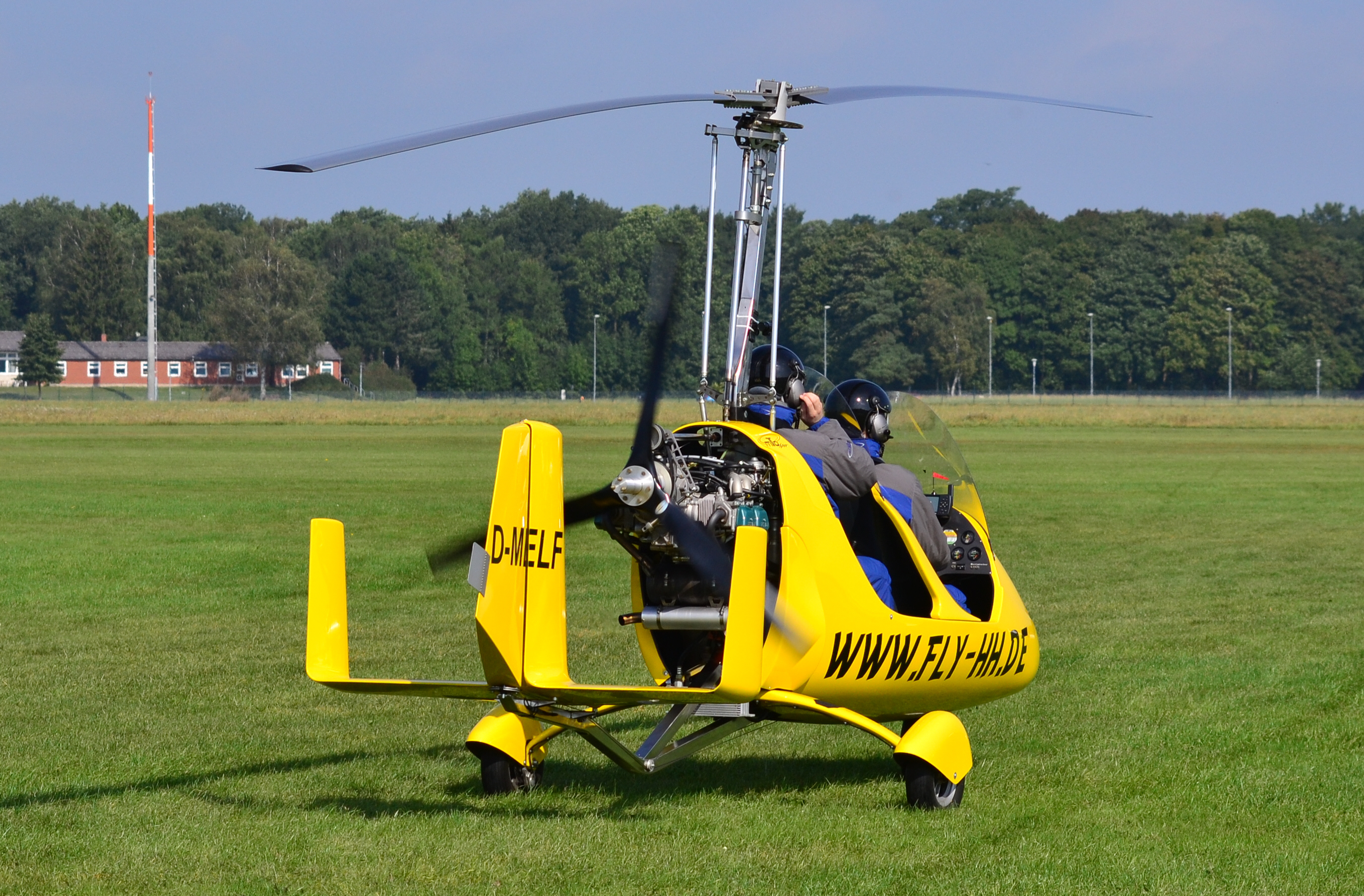
AutoGyro MTOsport

AutoGyro MT-03
Base model for the European and North American market. No longer in production.
RotorSport UK MT-03
Modified model for the United Kingdom market, imported assembled and modified by RotorSport UK.
AutoGyro MTOsport
Improved model for the European and North American market. This model offers a choice of three different rotor systems, two different propellers, two engine choices (Rotax 912S or 914) and floats.
AutoGyro MT0-Free
Version of the MTOsport, with no cockpit fairing fitted. This leaves the pilot out in the open air and has the benefit of eliminating the need for rudder input when turning, as the fairing acts as a destabilizer.

== Operators ==
=== Military ===
Ethiopia

- Ethiopian Air Force - 2 for special operations

== Specifications (MT-03) ==
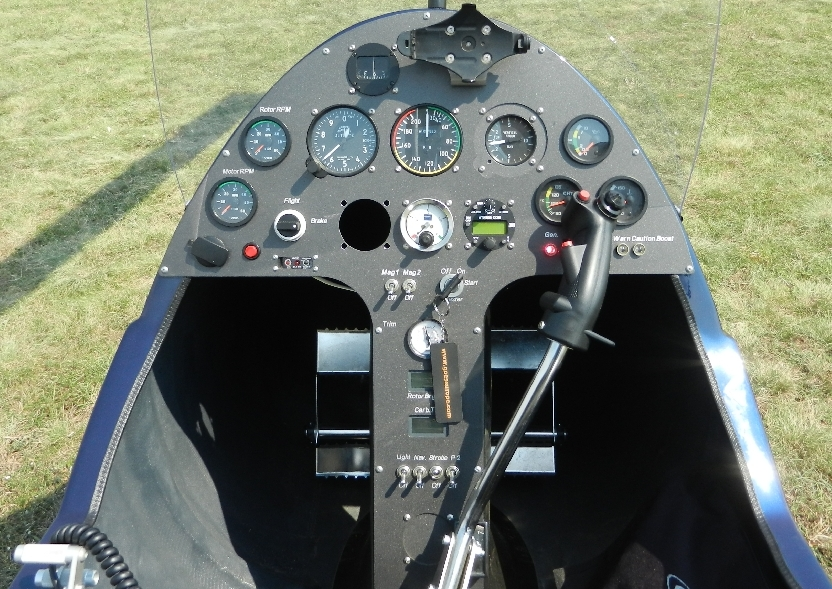
AutoGyro MT-03 instrument panel

Data from Bayerl and Duda

General characteristics

- Crew: one
- Capacity: one passenger
- Airfoil: NACA 8-H-12
- Empty weight: 245 kg (540 lb)
- Gross weight: 450 kg (992 lb)
- Fuel capacity: 34 litres (7.5 imp gal; 9.0 US gal) or optionally 68 litres (15 imp gal; 18 US gal)
- Powerplant: 1 × Rotax 912ULS four cylinder, liquid and air-cooled, four stroke aircraft engine, 75 kW (101 hp)
- Main rotor diameter: 8.4 m (27 ft 7 in)
- Main rotor area: 55.4 m^{2} (596 sq ft)
- Propellers: 3-bladed variable pitch composite

Performance

- Maximum speed: 185 km/h (115 mph, 100 kn)
- Cruise speed: 160 km/h (99 mph, 86 kn)
- Rate of climb: 5 m/s (980 ft/min)
- Lift-to-drag: 4
- Disk loading: 8.1 kg/m^{2} (1.7 lb/sq ft)
  Minimum speed: 20 knots
