= AutoGyro eCavalon =

German autogyro

eCavalon
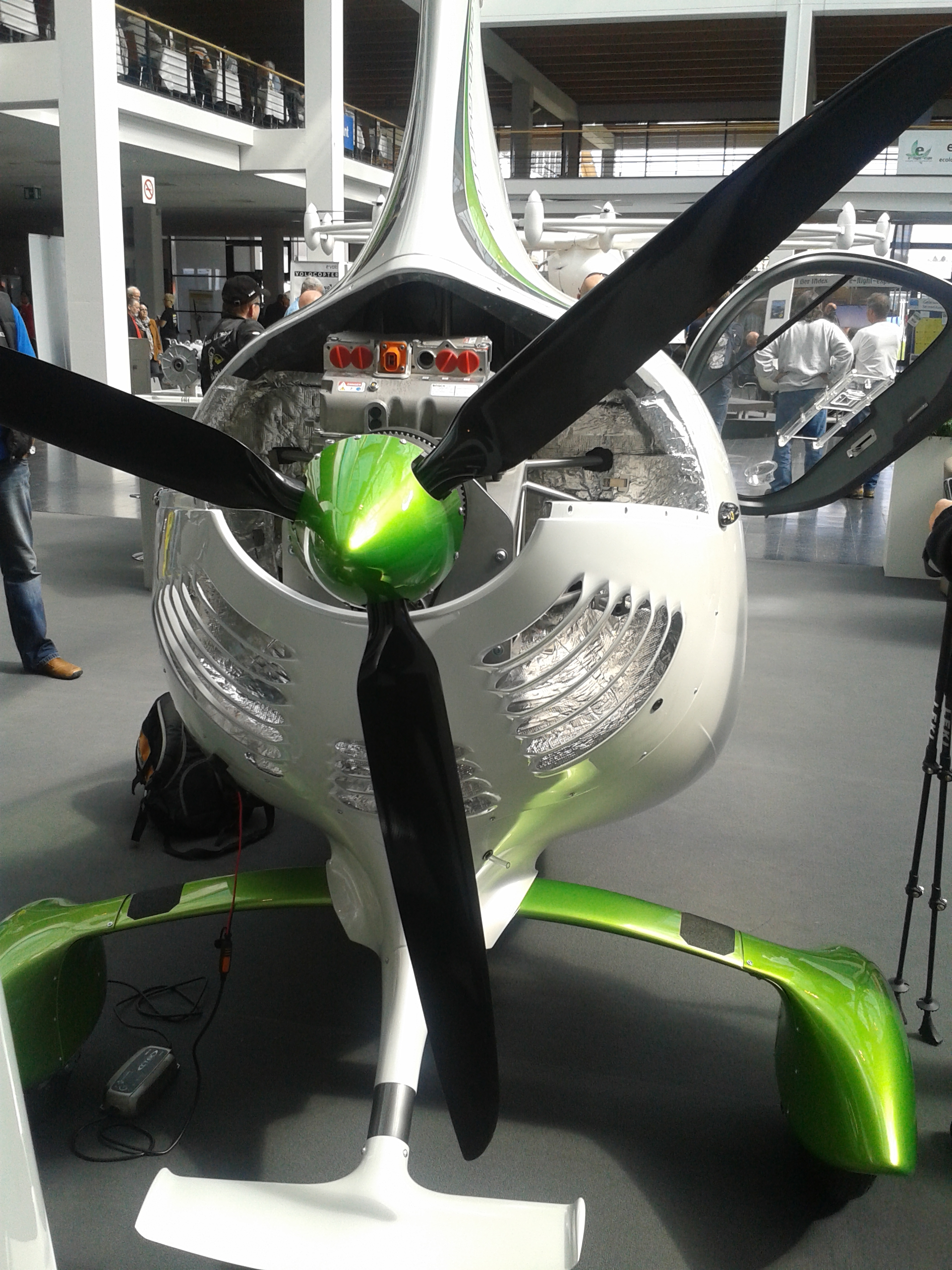

General information
- Type: Autogyro
- National origin: Germany
- Manufacturer: AutoGyro GmbH
- Status: Under development (2015)

History
- First flight: 2013
- Developed from: AutoGyro Cavalon

The AutoGyro eCavalon is a German single-seater electric powered autogyro introduced in 2013. The prototype is under development by AutoGyro GmbH of Hildesheim.

The design is a development of the piston-engine powered AutoGyro Cavalon.

== Design and development ==
The prototype was introduced in 2013 and was powered by a Bosch General Aviation Technology electric motor in Vienna. The Bosch motor was replaced by a Siemens electric motor in 2015.

The eCavalon features a single main rotor, a two-seats-in-side-by-side configuration enclosed cockpit, tricycle landing gear with wheel pants and a Siemens electric motor with a propeller mounted in pusher configuration.

The aircraft fuselage is made from composite material. Its two-bladed rotor has a diameter of 8.4 m (27.6 ft). The aircraft has a typical empty weight of 300 kg (660 lb) and a gross weight of 500 kg (1,100 lb), giving a useful load of 200 kg (440 lb).

Current endurance is 30 minutes, but battery improvements are expected to increase this to one hour, making the aircraft suitable for use in a flight training role.

== Specifications (eCavalon) ==
Data from Tacke

General characteristics

- Crew: one
- Capacity: one passenger
- Empty weight: 300 kg (661 lb)
- Gross weight: 500 kg (1,102 lb)
- Powerplant: 1 × Siemens electric aircraft engine
- Main rotor diameter: 8.4 m (27 ft 7 in)
- Propellers: 3-bladed composite

== See also ==
- List of rotorcraft
