= Eggenfellner E6 =

E6
- National origin: United States
- Manufacturer: Eggenfellner Aircraft
- Designer: Jan Eggenfellner
- First run: 1994
- Manufactured: 1994-2009

The Eggenfellner E6 is a series of American aircraft engines, developed by Jan Eggenfellner and produced by Eggenfellner Aircraft of Edgewater, Volusia County, Florida for use in homebuilt aircraft between 1994 and 2009.

== Design and development ==
Based on Subaru automotive engines, the E6 series are all six cylinder, four-stroke, horizontally opposed, liquid-cooled, gasoline engine designs, with mechanical gearbox reduction drives with a reduction ratio of 2.02:1. They employ electronic ignition and produce up to 250 hp (186 kW) at 6000 rpm.

The engine series was produced from 1994 until 2009, when the company went out of business in the Great Recession.

== Applications ==
The company's engines found a high degree of customer acceptance among owners of Van's Aircraft types, due to the completeness of the package provided and the low price. In 2003 it was reported that 298 engines had been sold to RV builders.

Other applications:

- Russian Gyroplanes Gyros-1 Farmer

== Variants ==
E6-3.0L
3,000 cc (183.1 cu in) engine, that produces 240 hp (179 kW) at 6500 rpm.
E6-3.6L
3,600 cc (219.7 cu in) engine, that produces 250 hp (186 kW) at 6000 rpm.

== Specifications (E6-3.0L) ==
Data from World Directory of Leisure Aviation 2011-12

=== General characteristics ===
- Type: Six cylinder, four stroke aircraft engine
- Displacement: 3,000 cc (183.1 cu in)
- Dry weight: 159 kg (350.5 lb)

=== Components ===
- Fuel type: gasoline
- Cooling system: liquid
- Reduction gear: mechanical gearbox reduction drive, reduction ratio of 2.02:1

=== Performance ===
- Power output: 240 hp (179 kW) at 6500 rpm

== See also ==
Related lists

- List of aircraft engines
