= Russian Gyroplanes Gyros-1 Farmer =

Russian gyroplane

Gyros-1 Farmer
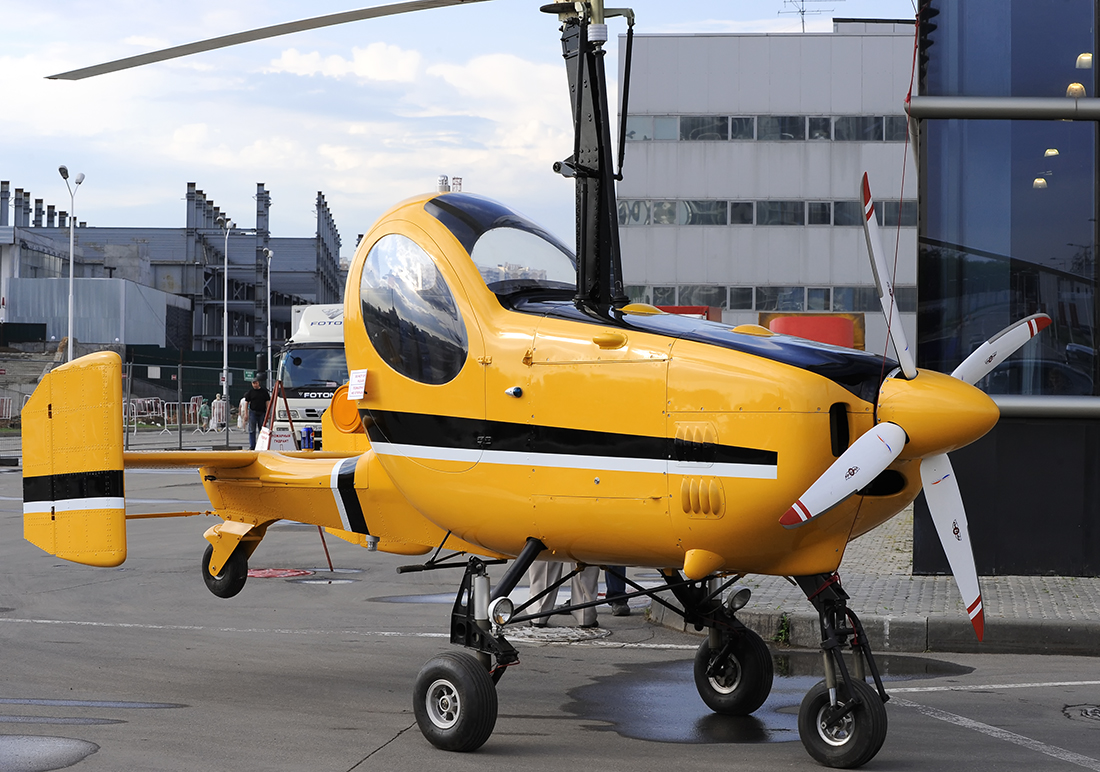

General information
- Type: Autogyro
- National origin: Russia
- Manufacturer: Russian Gyroplanes
- Status: In production (2017)

The Russian Gyroplanes Gyros-1 Farmer is a Russian autogyro of unconventional layout, designed and produced by Russian Gyroplanes of Zhukovsky, Moscow Oblast. The aircraft is supplied complete and ready-to-fly.

== Design and development ==
The Gyros-1 was designed for aerial work use, including aerial application, courier, forestry patrol, search and rescue and geological survey. It features a single main rotor, a single-seat enclosed cockpit accessed by a door, tricycle landing gear with additional tailwheel and a 4-blade traction propeller. It is powered by a six-cylinder, four-stroke, horizontally-opposed, liquid-cooled converted 200 hp (149 kW) Eggenfellner E6 Subaru gasoline engine.

The aircraft also fits an optional Racket 120 single-cylinder, two-stroke auxiliary engine for running the agricultural equipment, when installed.

The aircraft fuselage includes a baggage compartment or application hopper between the cockpit and the nose-mounted engine. It has a two-bladed rotor and a four-bladed propeller. The aircraft has a typical empty weight of 610 kg (1,345 lb) and a gross weight of 750 kg (1,653 lb), giving a useful load of 140 kg (309 lb). With full fuel of 100 litres (22 imp gal; 26 US gal) the payload for the pilot and payload is 68 kg (150 lb)., gasoline engine

== Specifications (Gyros-1) ==
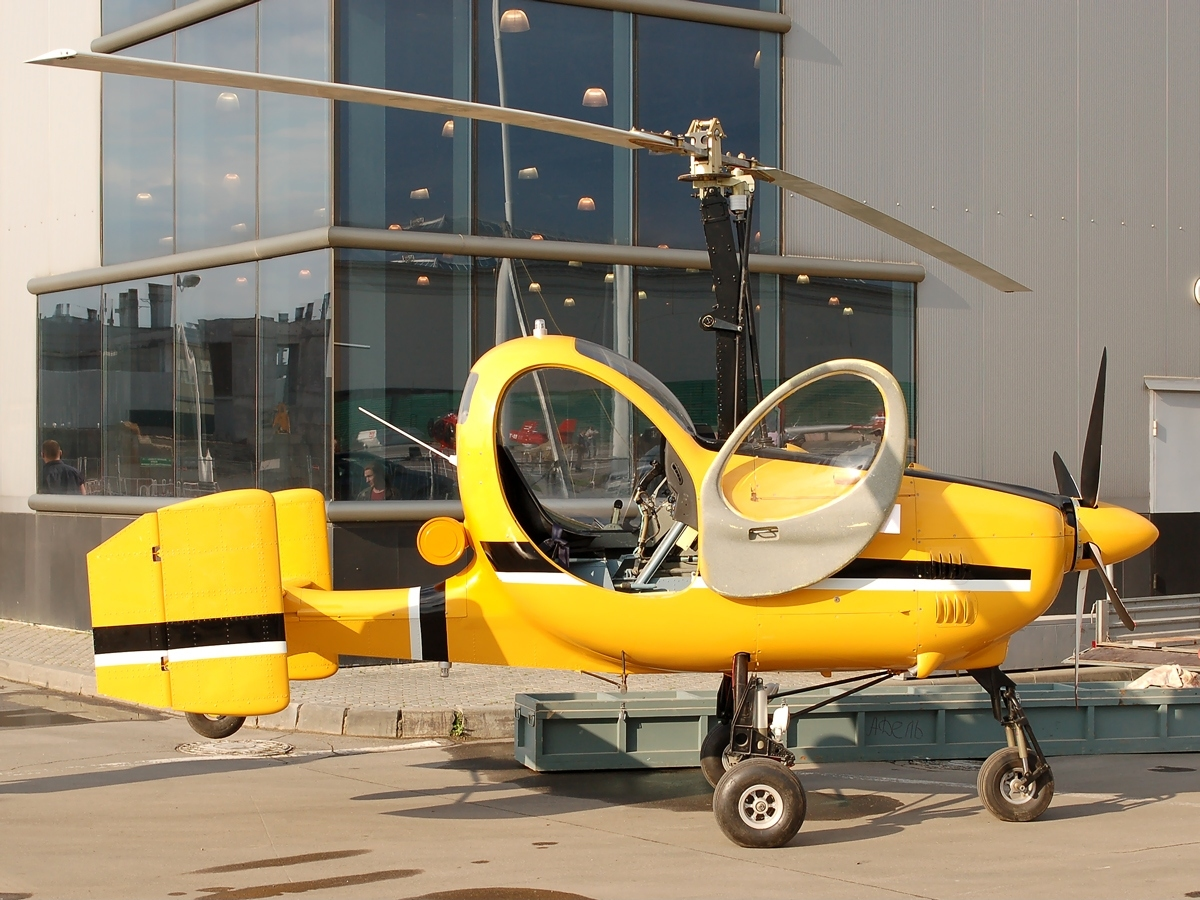
Gyros-1 Farmer

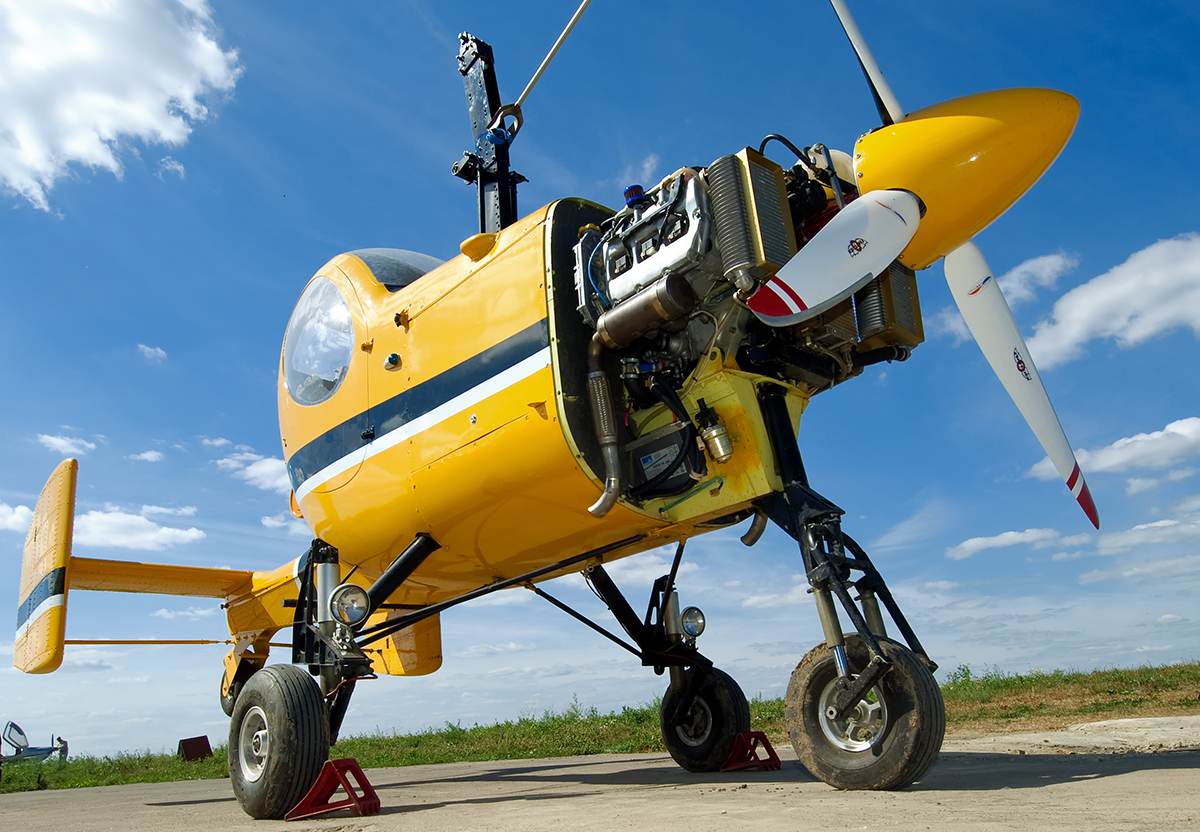
Gyros-1 Farmer

Data from Tacke and manufacturer

General characteristics

- Crew: one
- Empty weight: 610 kg (1,345 lb)
- Gross weight: 750 kg (1,653 lb)
- Fuel capacity: 100 litres (22 imp gal; 26 US gal)
- Powerplant: 1 × Eggenfellner E6 six cylinder, four-stroke, horizontally-opposed, liquid-cooled, gasoline engine, 150 kW (200 hp)
- Powerplant: 1 × Racket 120 auxiliary power single cylinder, two-stroke, air-cooled, gasoline engine, 10 kW (13 hp)
- Propellers: 4-bladed ground adjustable

Performance

- Cruise speed: 130 km/h (81 mph, 70 kn)
- Range: 800 km (500 mi, 430 nmi)
- Rate of climb: 3.1 m/s (610 ft/min)

== See also ==
- List of rotorcraft
- Russian Gyroplanes Gyros-2 Smartflier
