= RotorSport UK Calidus =

Calidus
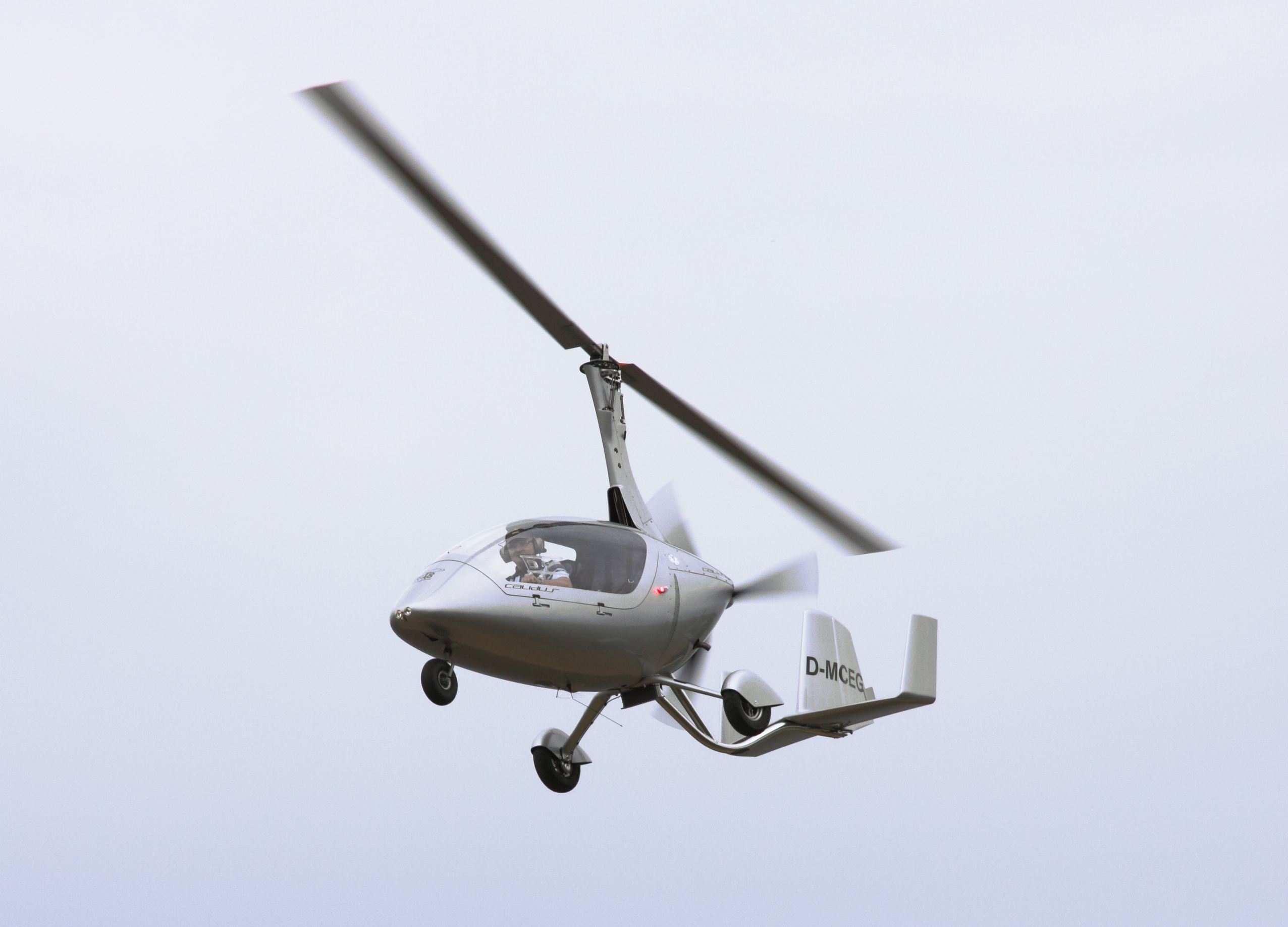

General information
- Type: Autogyro
- National origin: Germany and United Kingdom
- Manufacturer: AutoGyro Gmbh and RotorSport UK

History
- Introduction date: 2009
- Developed from: AutoGyro Calidus

The RotorSport Calidus is a German tandem two-seater autogyro modified in the UK to meet British Civil Airworthiness Requirements CAP643 Section T. The Calidus is an enclosed-cockpit development of the open-cockpit RotorSport UK MT-03. New-build AutoGyro Calidus aircraft are imported from the manufacturers, AutoGyro GmbH in Hildeshem, Germany and completed to British regulations by RotorSport UK Ltd (now AGC).

== Design and development ==
The Calidus is powered by a 100 hp (75 kW) Rotax 912 ULS, although optionally a 115 hp (86 kW) Rotax 914 UL Turbo can be fitted. Fuel capacity is either 39 litres in a single tank or 74 litres in two tanks. The Calidus has an aerodynamic fuselage pod, giving 20 knots higher maximum speed than the MT-03. While the open-cockpit MT-03 (which continues in production) is promoted as a "motorbike in the skies", the Calidus is aimed at a different market. The Calidus' fully enclosed cockpit protects the occupants from exposure to inclement weather, while the aircraft's higher cruise speed makes it more suitable for long-distance touring.

The panel can be equipped with conventional instruments and/or a "glass panel" according to certification requirements and the buyer's needs. For the UK RotorSport version, either a fixed-pitch propeller or a ground-adjustable propeller may be fitted; but in Germany the unmodified AutoGyro Calidus has either a ground-adjustable propeller or an inflight-adjustable controllable-pitch propeller.

The Calidus has a take off distance of 10 to 70 metres and lands in 15 metres, or can land vertically in some circumstances. Flying speeds range from 20 mph (32 km/h) to 120 mph (193 km/h);. An optional heater makes cold-weather flying feasible; but although navigation lights may be fitted, night flying is not permitted. The payload is 230 kg for versions with the Rotax 912, so even with a full fuel load of 54 kg, two crew of up to 88 kg each can be accommodated.

== UK manufacturer AGC ==
The UK manufacturer, formerly RotorSport UK Ltd (RSUK), is now known as AutoGyro Certification Ltd (AGC). AGC holds the CAA AANs for the gyroplanes in the UK, and are responsible for the Continued Airworthiness of all RSUK gyroplanes. The company is based in Wentnor, Bishops Castle Shropshire.

== Operators ==
Belarus

Brest Border guard, at least one labeled EW-443SL

== Specifications (Rotax 912 variant) ==
General characteristics

- Crew: one
- Capacity: one passenger
- Length: 4.8 m (15 ft 9 in)
- Width: 1.7 m (5 ft 7 in)
- Height: 2.7 m (8 ft 10 in)
- Empty weight: 270 kg (595 lb)
- Max takeoff weight: 500 kg (1,102 lb)
- Powerplant: 1 × Rotax 912 ULS four-stroke piston engine, 75 kW (100 hp)
- Main rotor diameter: 8.4 m (27 ft 7 in)
- Propellers: 3-bladed IVO ground-adjustable, composite, 1.72 m (5 ft 8 in) diameter

Performance

- Maximum speed: 180 km/h (110 mph, 97 kn)
- Cruise speed: 160 km/h (99 mph, 86 kn)
- Never exceed speed: 185 km/h (115 mph, 100 kn) Vne
- Range: 800 km (500 mi, 430 nmi)

== See also ==
Related lists

- List of rotorcraft
