= AutoGyro Cavalon =

German autogyro

Cavalon
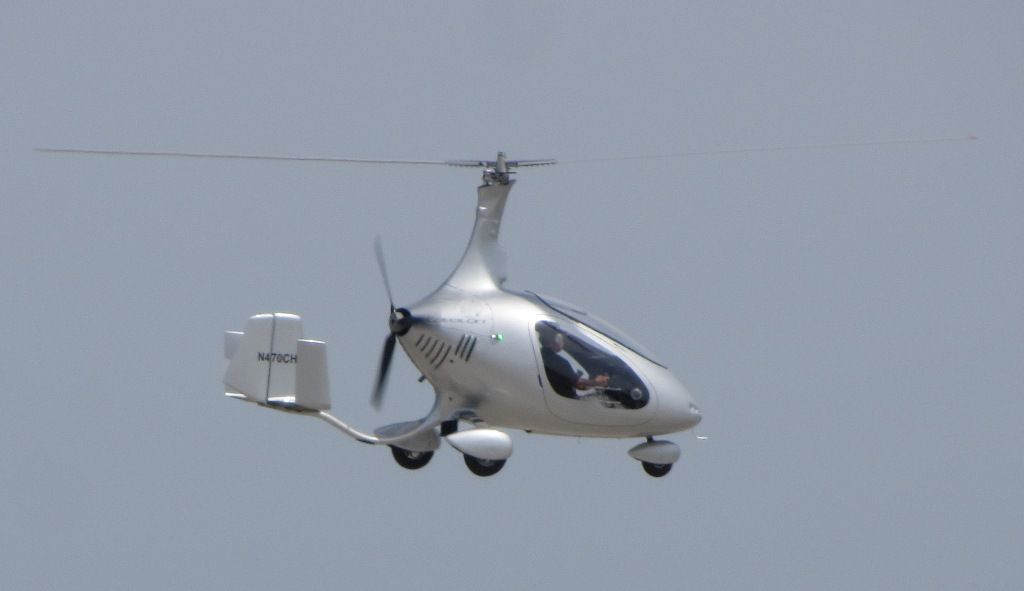

General information
- Type: Autogyro
- National origin: Germany
- Manufacturer: AutoGyro GmbH
- Status: In production (2011)

History
- Developed from: AutoGyro Calidus
- Variant: AutoGyro eCavalon

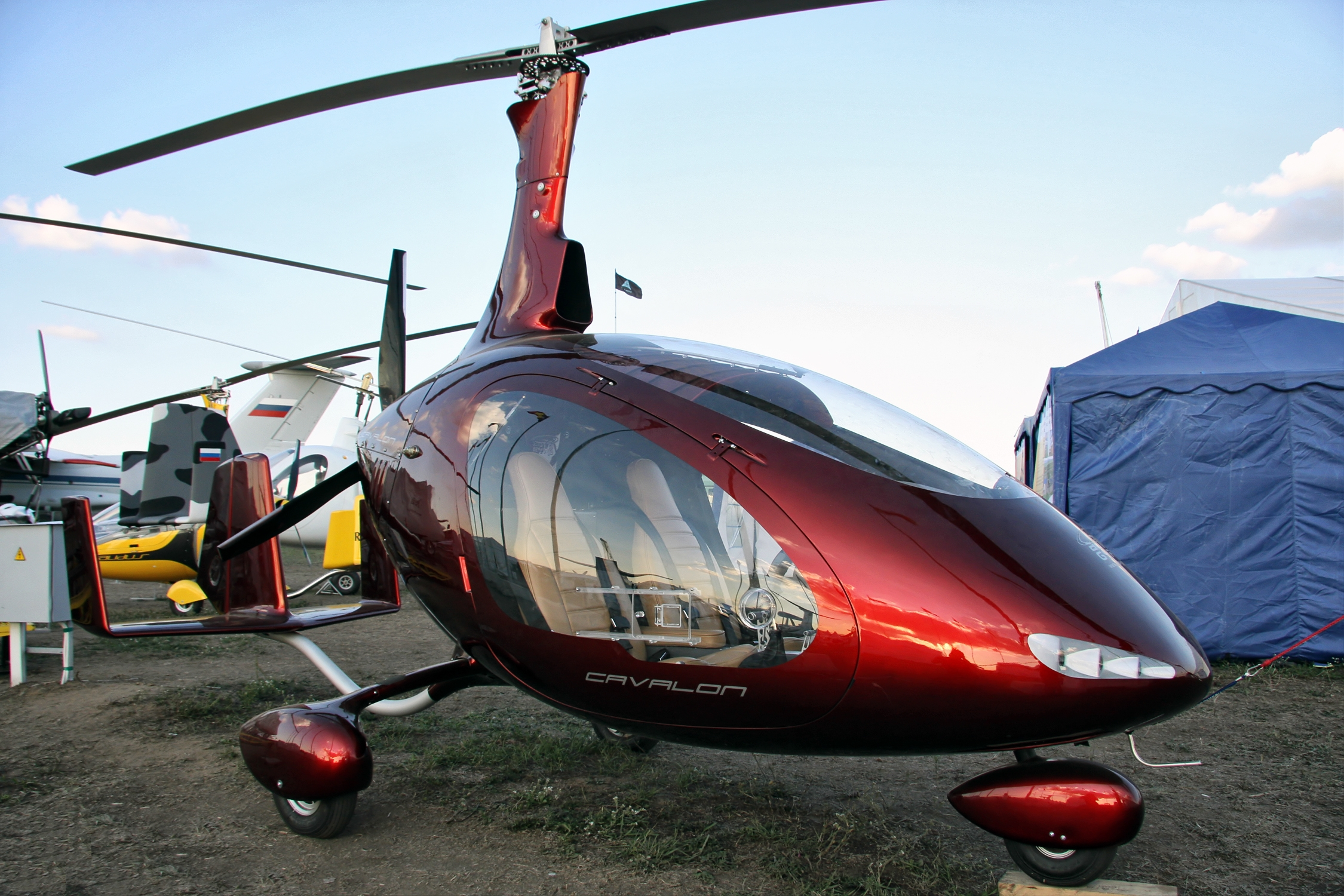
AutoGyro Cavalon

The Autogyro Cavalon is a German autogyro, designed and produced by AutoGyro GmbH of Hildesheim. It was introduced at the 2011 Aero show in Friedrichshafen. The aircraft is supplied as a complete ready-to-fly-aircraft.

== Design and development ==
The Cavalon is a two-seats-in-side-by-side configuration development of the tandem-seating AutoGyro Calidus. It features a single main rotor, an enclosed cockpit with a complete aerodynamic cockpit fairing, tricycle landing gear with wheel pants and a four-cylinder, air and liquid-cooled, four-stroke, dual-ignition 100 hp (75 kW) Rotax 912 engine or turbocharged 115 hp (86 kW) Rotax 914 or 135 hp (101 kW) Rotax 915iS engine in pusher configuration.

The aircraft fuselage is made from composites and is a faired teardrop shape to ensure smooth airflow over the variable pitch pusher propeller. Its 8.4 m (27.6 ft) diameter rotor has a chord of 20 cm (7.9 in). The aircraft has a gross weight of 450 kg (990 lb). The design incorporates vibration dampers that greatly reduce the level of main rotor vibration transmitted to the cockpit.

The design was developed into the AutoGyro eCavalon electric aircraft in 2013.

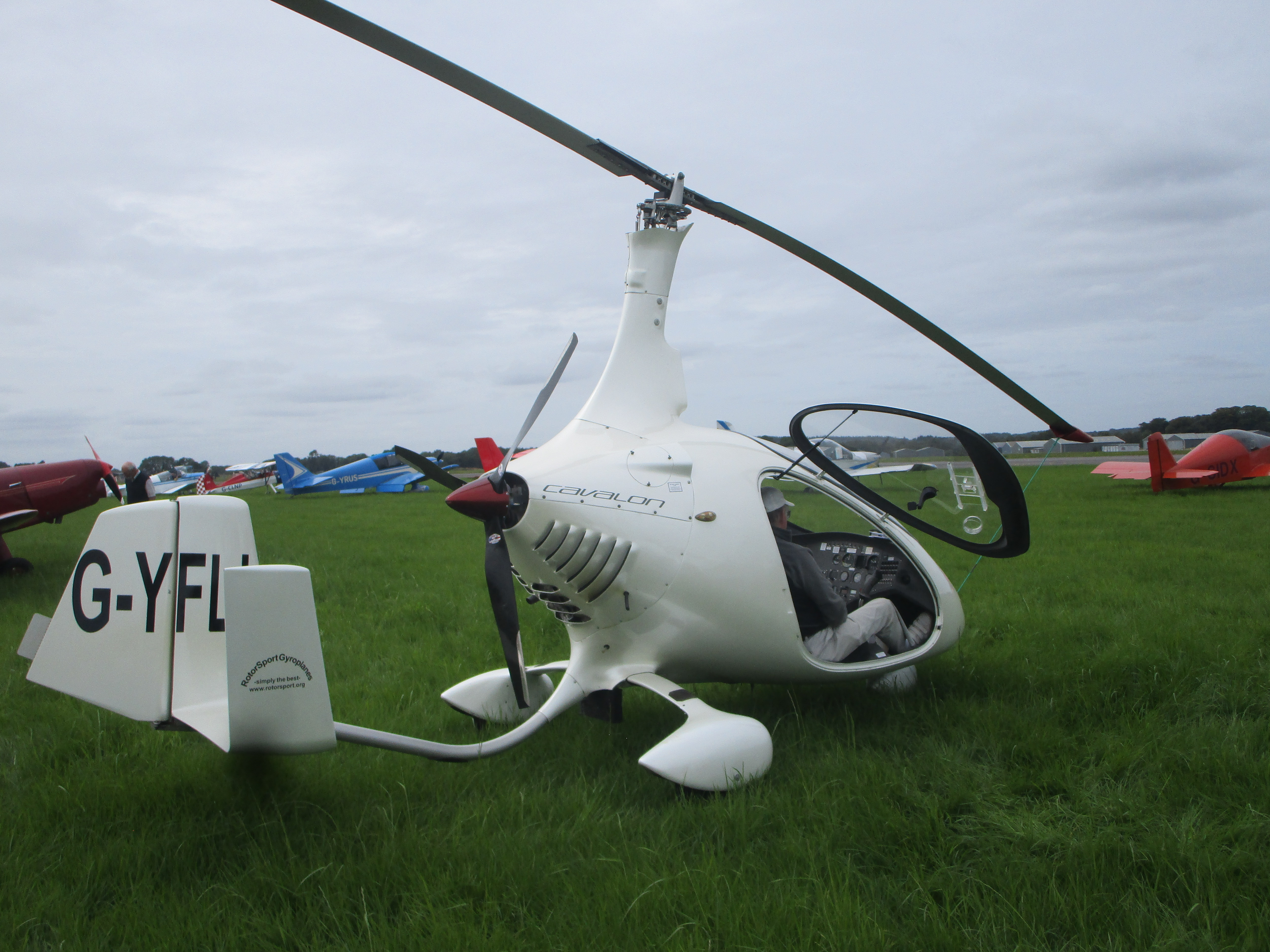
G-YFLI - AutoGyro Cavalon on the grass at Dunkeswell

== Operational history ==
By October 2019, 50 examples had been registered in the United States with the Federal Aviation Administration, all of them in the Experimental - Amateur-built category.

Gendarmerie General Command of Turkey uses a total of 9 units.

== Specifications (Cavalon) ==
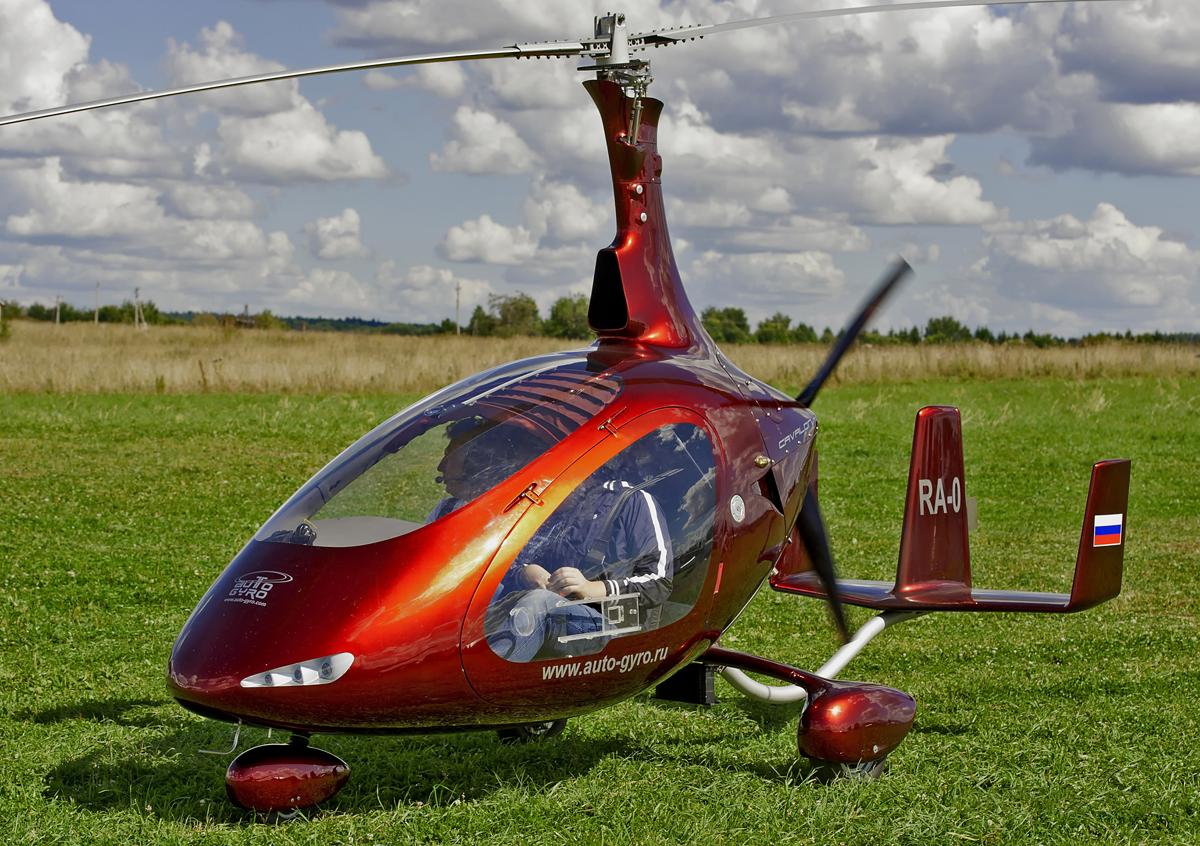
AutoGyro Cavalon

Data from Manufacturer and the World Directory of Leisure Aviation 2011-12

General characteristics

- Crew: 1
- Capacity: 1 passenger
- Length: 4.6 m (15 ft 1 in)
- Width: 1.9 m (6 ft 3 in)
- Height: 2.8 m (9 ft 2 in)
- Gross weight: 450 kg (992 lb)
- Powerplant: 1 × Rotax 912ULS horizontally opposed four cylinder, liquid and air-cooled, four stroke aircraft engine, 75 kW (100 hp)
- Main rotor diameter: 8.4 m (27 ft 7 in)
- Propellers: 3-bladed composite

Performance

- Maximum speed: 160 km/h (99 mph, 86 kn)
- Cruise speed: 145 km/h (90 mph, 78 kn)
