= Radne Raket 120 =

Swedish aircraft engine

Raket 120
- Type: Single cylinder, two-stroke
- National origin: Sweden
- Manufacturer: Radne Motor AB
- Major applications: Powered hang gliders

The Radne Raket 120 (English: Rocket) is a lightweight single cylinder, two-stroke aircraft engine used for powered hang gliders, paramotors and ultralight aircraft that is built by Radne Motor AB of Haninge, Sweden.

== Design and development ==
The Raket 120 features electronic ignition and a Walbro carburetor. It weighs 6.8 kg (15 lb) and, due to its 13,000 rpm redline usually drives a propeller through a 3.6:1 reduction drive. The engine is equipped with a centrifugal clutch to allow running the engine without turning the propeller.

== Variants ==
Raket 120 Aero
Model with recoil starter.
Raket 120 Aero ES
Model with electric starter.

== Applications ==
- Adventure R series
- Aerosport OY Spider
- Airtime Explorer
- Av8er Observer Light
- Av8er Orbiter Lite
- Bilsam Sky Walker
- Blue Yonder EZ Fun Flyer
- Dynamic Sport Rocket
- Flylight Doodle Bug
- Paramotor Mosquito
- Paratour SD 120
- Pegasus Booster
- Rad MXL
- Rad RXL
- Rad SXL Custom
- Russian Gyroplanes Gyros-1 Farmer (aux engine)
- Russian Gyroplanes Gyros-2 Smartflier (aux engine)
- Skyrunner Light
- Spartan BP Parawing
- Sperwill 120
- Swedish Aerosport Mosquito
- Time To Fly Racket
- Walkerjet Spider
- Wasp SP Mk2
- Winds Italia Raven

== Specifications (Raket 120 Aero) ==
Data from Radne, Wasp Systems and The World Directory of Leisure Aviation 2011-12

=== General characteristics ===
- Type: two-stroke, single cylinder
- Bore: 60 mm (2.4 in)
- Stroke: 42 mm (1.7 in)
- Displacement: 118.8 cc (7.2 cu in)
- Length: 219 mm (8.6 in)
- Width: 234 mm (9.2 in)
- Height: 171 mm (6.7 in)
- Dry weight: 6.8 kg (15 lb)

=== Components ===
- Oil system: premixed 4% oil to fuel, 25:1
- Cooling system: air cooled
- Reduction gear: 3.6:1 belt drive and centrifugal clutch

=== Performance ===
- Power output: 14 hp (10 kW) at 9000 rpm
- Compression ratio: 10:1
- Fuel consumption: 1.15 to 2 litres (0.25 to 0.44 imp gal; 0.30 to 0.53 US gal) per hour
