= RotorSport UK MT-03 =

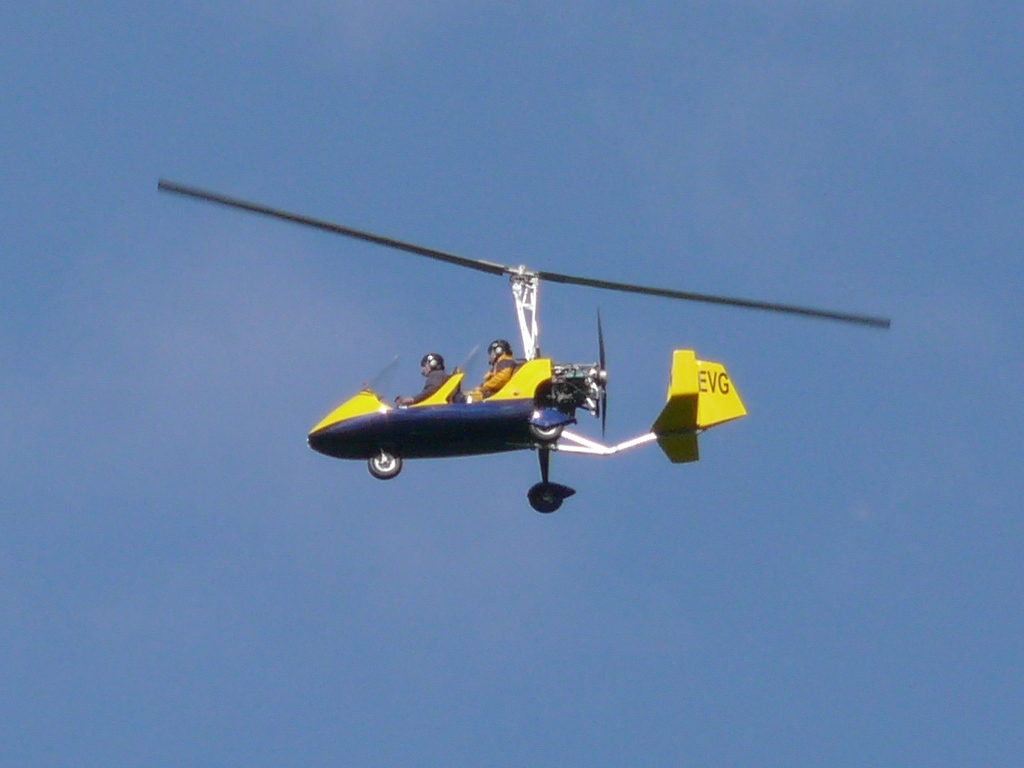

General information
- Type: Autogyro
- National origin: United Kingdom
- Manufacturer: RotorSport UK

History
- Developed from: AutoGyro MT-03
- Variant: BAE Ampersand
- Developed into: RotorSport UK Calidus

The RotorSport UK MT-03 is a two-seat autogyro manufactured to British Civil Airworthiness Requirements CAP643 Section T. New build-aircraft based on the AutoGyro MT-03 design are imported from Germany and completed to British regulations by RotorSport UK Limited in the United Kingdom.

The autogyro has two tandem seats and is powered by a 100 hp (75 kW) Rotax 912 ULS although optionally a 115 hp (86 kW) Rotax 914 UL Turbo can be fitted.

An unmanned reconnaissance technology demonstrator variant has been proposed as the BAE Ampersand.

A derivative of the MT-03 is the enclosed-cockpit RotorSport UK Calidus.

== Specifications (Rotax 912) ==
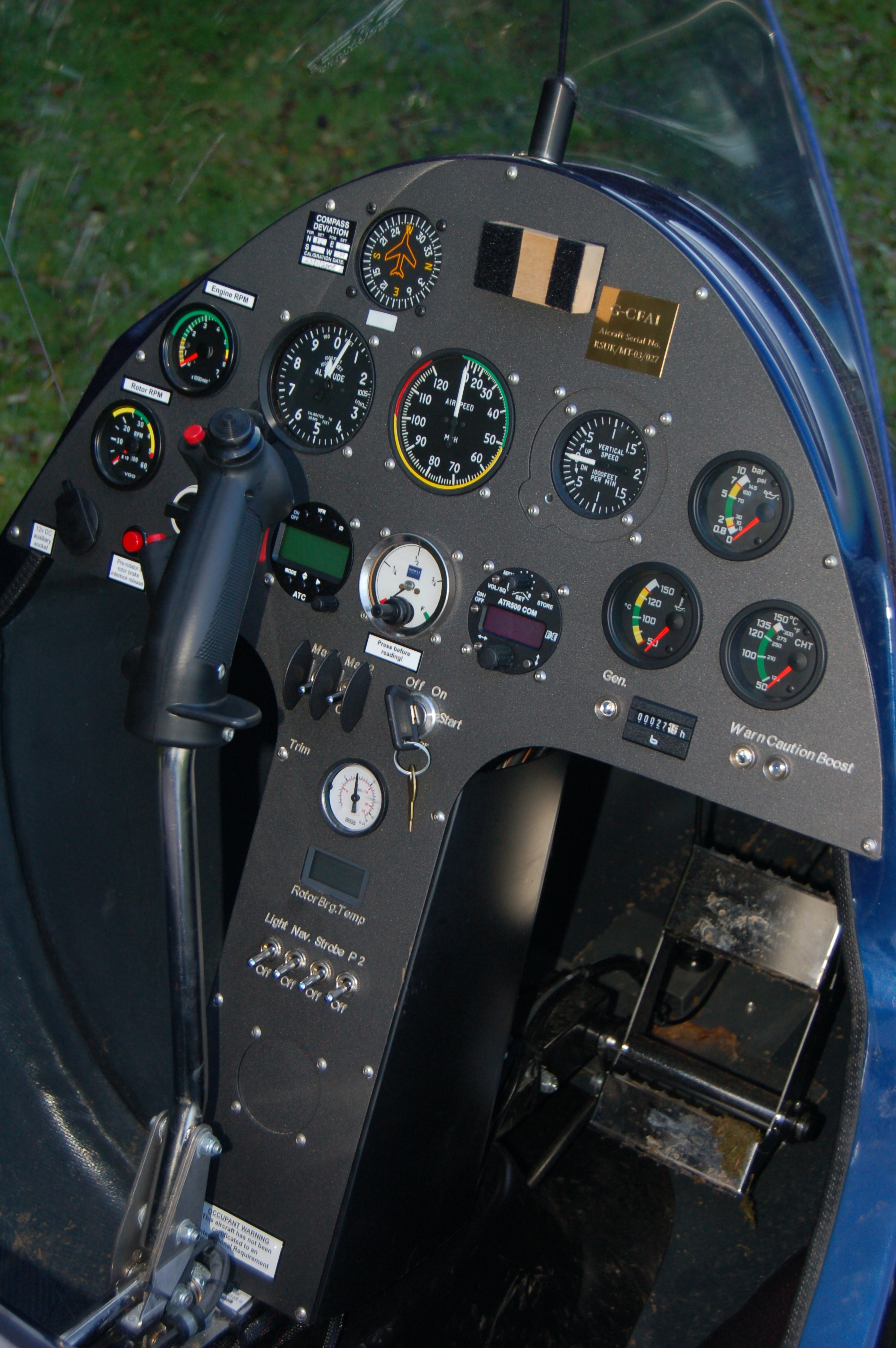

General characteristics

- Crew: 2
- Length: 4.95 m (16 ft 3 in)
- Width: 1.82 m (6 ft 0 in)
- Height: 2.7 m (8 ft 10 in)
- Empty weight: 250 kg (551 lb)
- Max takeoff weight: 450 kg (992 lb)
- Powerplant: 1 × Rotax 912 ULS four-stroke piston engine
- Main rotor diameter: 8.4 m (27 ft 7 in)
- Propellers: 3-bladed HTC 3 blade ground adjustable, composite, 1.72 m (5 ft 8 in) diameter

Performance

- Never exceed speed: 160 km/h (100 mph, 87 kn) Vne
- Rate of climb: 5.6 m/s (1,100 ft/min)

== See also ==
- AutoGyro MT-03
- List of rotorcraft
