= AutoGyro Calidus =

German autogyro

Calidus
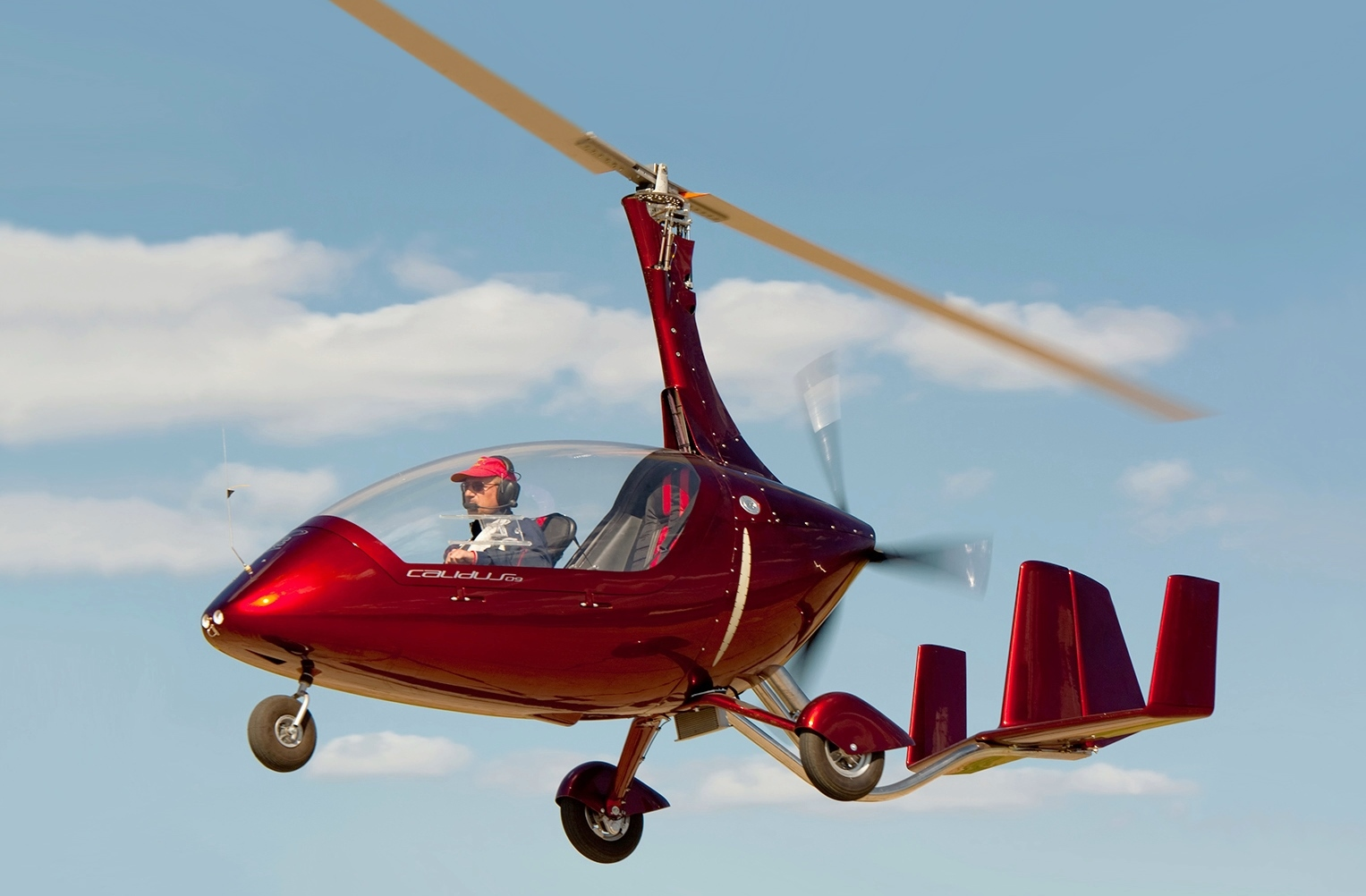

General information
- Type: Autogyro
- National origin: Germany
- Manufacturer: AutoGyro GmbH
- Status: In production

History
- Introduction date: 2009
- Variants: RotorSport UK Calidus; AutoGyro Cavalon

The AutoGyro Calidus is a German autogyro, designed and produced by AutoGyro GmbH of Hildesheim. The aircraft is supplied as a complete ready-to-fly-aircraft.

The Calidus was approved in the United Kingdom in 2010 in a modified form as the RotorSport UK Calidus.

== Design and development ==
The Calidus features a single main rotor; a two-seats in tandem enclosed cockpit with a complete aerodynamic cockpit fairing; tricycle landing gear with wheel pants; and a four-cylinder, air- and liquid-cooled, four-stroke, dual-ignition 100 hp (75 kW) Rotax 912 engine or turbocharged 115 hp (86 kW) Rotax 914 engine in pusher configuration.

The aircraft's fuselage is made from composites and is a faired teardrop shape to ensure smooth airflow over the variable pitch pusher propeller. Its 8.4 m (27.6 ft) diameter rotor has a chord of 20 cm (7.9 in). The aircraft has an empty weight of 265 kg (584 lb) and a gross weight of 450 kg (990 lb), giving a useful load of 185 kg (408 lb). The design incorporates vibration dampers that greatly reduce the level of main rotor vibration transmitted to the cockpit.

The design is noted for both its cruise speed of 160 km/h (99 mph) and range of 800 km (500 mi). It was developed into the side-by-side configuration AutoGyro Cavalon.

== Operational history ==
By December 2012, eight examples had been registered in the United States with the Federal Aviation Administration. Most are in the Experimental - Amateur-built or Experimental - Exhibition categories. Also by December 2012, three examples had been registered with Transport Canada in the Special Certificate of Airworthiness Limited category.

== Variants ==
AutoGyro Calidus
Base model for the European and North American market.
RotorSport UK Calidus
Modified model for the United Kingdom market, imported assembled and modified by RotorSport UK.

== Specifications (Calidus) ==
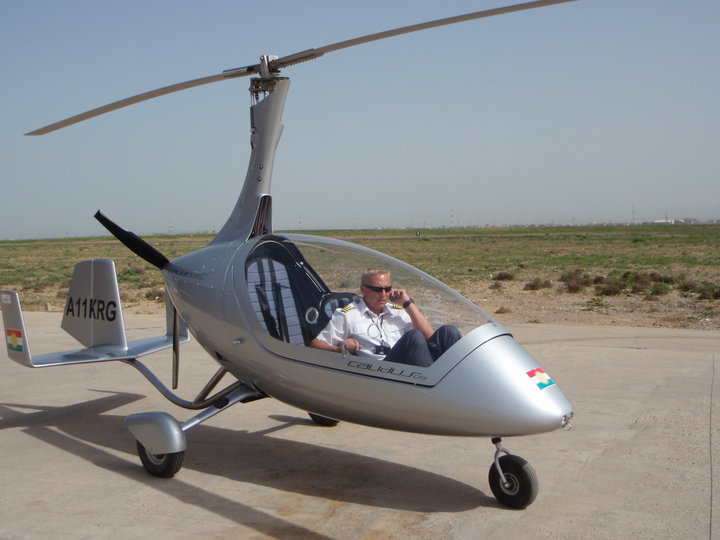
AutoGyro Calidus

Data from Bayerl and the manufacturer

General characteristics

- Crew: one
- Capacity: one passenger
- Length: 4.78 m (15 ft 8 in)
- Width: 1.73 m (5 ft 8 in)
- Height: 2.74 m (9 ft 0 in)
- Airfoil: NACA 8-H-12
- Empty weight: 265 kg (584 lb)
- Gross weight: 450 kg (992 lb)
- Fuel capacity: 86 litres (19 imp gal; 23 US gal)
- Powerplant: 1 × Rotax 912ULS four cylinder, liquid and air-cooled, four stroke aircraft engine, 75 kW (101 hp)
- Main rotor diameter: 8.4 m (27 ft 7 in)
- Main rotor area: 55.4 m^{2} (596 sq ft)
- Propellers: 3-bladed variable pitch composite, 1.72 m (5 ft 8 in) diameter

Performance

- Maximum speed: 185 km/h (115 mph, 100 kn)
- Cruise speed: 160 km/h (99 mph, 86 kn)
- Never exceed speed: 185 km/h (115 mph, 100 kn)
- Rate of climb: 5 m/s (980 ft/min)
- Disk loading: 8.1 kg/m^{2} (1.7 lb/sq ft)

== See also ==
- Niki Lightning - autogyro
