= List of Beechcraft models =

The following is a list of all aerospace models produced by Beechcraft since its inception in 1932.

== Models ==
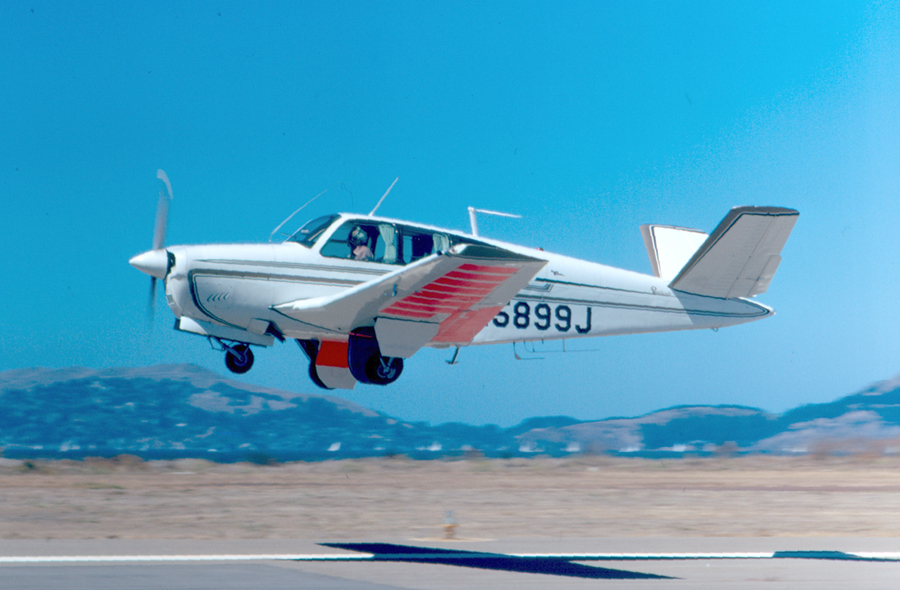
Beechcraft Bonanza, the brand's most-produced model with over 17,000 examples

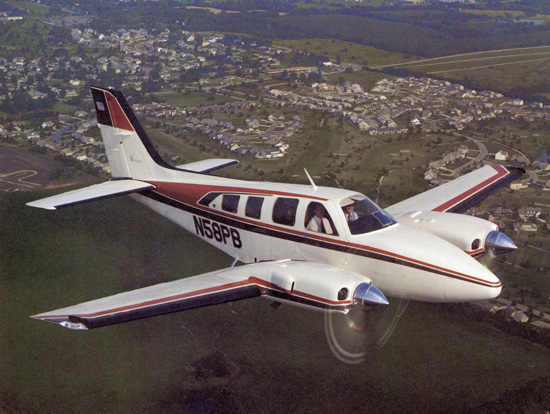
Beechcraft 58 Baron

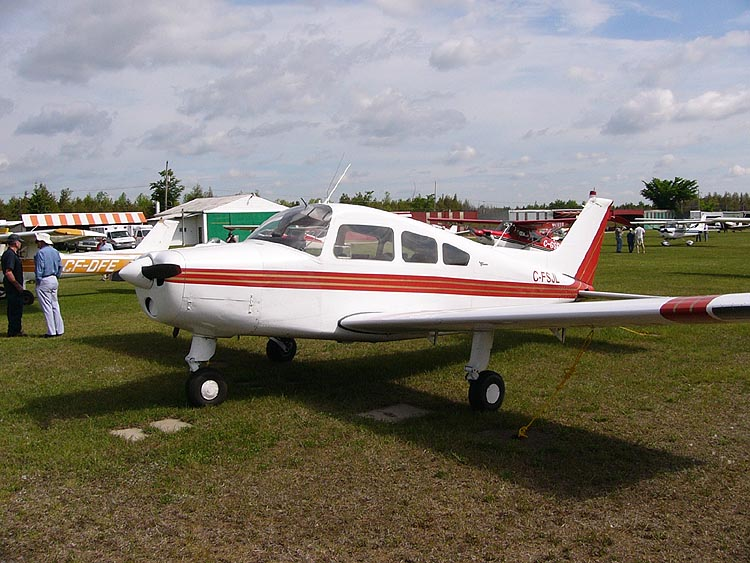
Beechcraft A23 Musketeer

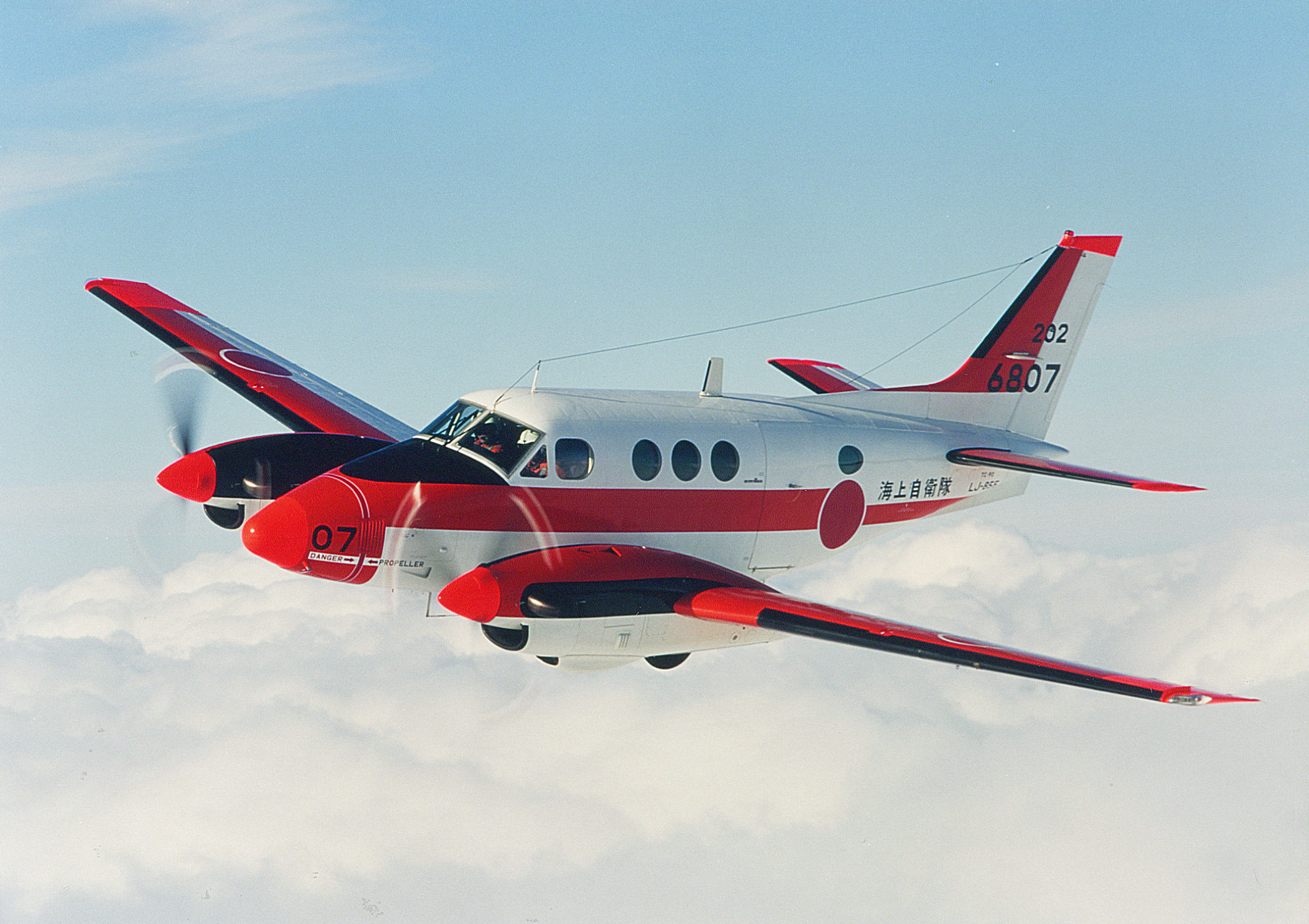
Beechcraft C90 King Air

| Model name | First flight | Number built | Type |
|---|---|---|---|
Models 1 through 16 Travel Air designs
| Beechcraft Model 16 | 1970 | 1 | Prototype single piston engine monoplane trainer |
| Beechcraft Model 17 Staggerwing | 1932 | 785 | Single piston engine biplane utility airplane |
| Beechcraft Model 18 | 1937 | 9,000+ | Twin piston engine monoplane transport airplane |
| Beechcraft Model 19 Musketeer Sport | | 922 | Single piston engine monoplane utility airplane |
| Beechcraft Model 20M | N/A | 0 | Unbuilt twin piston engine biplane utility airplane |
| Beechcraft Model 22 | N/A | 0 | Unbuilt bomber |
| Beechcraft Model 23 | 1961 | 2,331 (Note: Includes 48 CT-134s.) | Single piston engine monoplane utility airplane |
| Beechcraft Model M-23N | N/A | 0 | Unbuilt carrier based scout bomber |
| Beechcraft Model 24 | N/A | 0 | Unbuilt twin piston engine biplane observation airplane |
| Beechcraft Model 24 | 1965 | 1,143 | Single piston engine monoplane utility airplane |
| Beechcraft Model 25 | 1941 | 1 | Prototype twin piston engine monoplane trainer |
| Beechcraft Model 25J | N/A | 0 | Unbuilt twin engine observation airplane |
| Beechcraft Model 26 Wichita | | 1,771 (Note: 600 additional aircraft built by Globe.) | Twin piston engine monoplane trainer |
| Beechcraft Model 026 | N/A | 0 | Unbuilt observation airplane |
| Beechcraft Model 27 | N/A | 0 | Unbuilt four piston engine biplane transport |
| Beechcraft Model 28 Grizzly | 1944 | 2 | Prototype twin piston engine monoplane attack airplane |
| Beechcraft Model 33 | 1959 | 3,249 | Single piston engine monoplane utility airplane |
| Beechcraft Model 34 Twin-Quad | 1947 | 1 | Prototype four piston engine monoplane airliner |
| Beechcraft Model 35 Bonanza (Note: Also marketed as Debonair.) | 1945 | 10,661 | Single piston engine monoplane utility airplane |
| Beechcraft Model 36 | | 2,709+ | Single piston engine monoplane utility airplane |
| Beechcraft Model 38P Lightning | 1982 | 1 | Prototype single turboprop engine monoplane utility airplane |
| Beechcraft Model 40 | | 1 | Prototype twin piston engine monoplane utility airplane |
| Beechcraft Model 45 Mentor | 1948 | 2,300+ | Single piston engine monoplane trainer |
| Beechcraft Model 46 | N/A | 1 | Prototype twin piston engine monoplane trainer |
| Beechcraft Model 50 Twin Bonanza | 1949 | 975 | Twin piston engine monoplane utility airplane |
| Beechcraft Model 55 Baron | 1960 | 3,651 | Twin piston engine monoplane utility airplane |
| Beechcraft Model 56 Baron | 1966 | 93 | Twin piston engine monoplane utility airplane |
| Beechcraft Model 58 Baron | 1969 | 2,770+ | Twin piston engine monoplane utility airplane |
| Beechcraft Model 60 Duke | 1966 | 596 | Twin piston engine monoplane utility airplane |
| Beechcraft Model 65 Queen Air | 1958 | 412 | Twin piston engine monoplane utility airplane |
| Beechcraft Model 70 Queen Air | | 35 | Twin piston engine monoplane utility airplane |
| Beechcraft Model 73 Jet Mentor | 1955 | 1 | Prototype single jet engine monoplane trainer |
| Beechcraft Model 76 Duchess | 1974 | 437 | Twin piston engine monoplane utility airplane |
| Beechcraft Model 77 Skipper | 1978 | 312 | Single piston engine monoplane trainer |
| Beechcraft Model 79 Queen Airliner | N/A | 0 | Unbuilt twin piston engine monoplane airliner |
| Beechcraft Model 80 Queen Air | 1961 | 511 | Twin piston engine monoplane utility airplane |
| Beechcraft Model 87 | | 1 | Prototype twin turboprop engine monoplane utility airplane |
| Beechcraft Model 88 Queen Air | 1965 | 47 | Twin piston engine monoplane utility airplane |
| Beechcraft Model 89 Queen Airliner | N/A | 0 | Unbuilt twin piston engine monoplane utility airplane |
| Beechcraft Model 90 King Air | 1964 | 2,178 | Twin turboprop engine monoplane utility airplane |
| Beechcraft Model 95 Travel Air | 1956 | 720 | Twin piston engine monoplane utility airplane |
| Beechcraft Model 99 Airliner | 1966 | 239 | Twin turboprop engine monoplane airliner |
| Beechcraft Model 100 King Air | 1969 | 383 | Twin turboprop engine monoplane utility airplane |
| Beechcraft Model 112 | N/A | 0 | Unbuilt twin turboprop |
| Beechcraft Model 115 | 1983 | 1 | Prototype twin turboprop engine monoplane business aircraft |
| Beechcraft Model 120 | N/A | 0 | Unbuilt twin turboprop |
| Beechcraft Model 200 Super King Air | 1972 | | Twin turboprop engine monoplane utility airplane |
| Beechcraft Model 220 Denali | 2021 | 2 | Single turboprop engine monoplane utility airplane |
| Beechcraft Model 300 Super King Air | 1981 | | Twin turboprop engine monoplane utility airplane |
| Beechcraft Model 390 Premier | 1998 | 292 | Twin jet engine monoplane business jet |
| Beechcraft Model 400 Beechjet | 1986 (Note: First flight of first Beechcraft assembled airframe.) | 859 (Note: 92 additional aircraft built by Mitsubishi as MU-300.) | Twin jet engine monoplane business jet |
| Beechcraft Model 999 | | | Target drone |
| Beechcraft Model 1001 | | | Target drone |
| Beechcraft Model 1013 | | | Reconnaissance drone |
| Beechcraft Model 1019 | 1961 | 5,000+ | Target drone |
| Beechcraft Model 1025 | | | Target drone |
| Beechcraft Model 1074 Pave Eagle | | 6 | Prototype single piston engine monoplane reconnaissance airplane |
| Beechcraft Model 1079 Pave Eagle II | | 27 | Single piston engine monoplane reconnaissance airplane |
| Beechcraft Model 1300 Commuter | | 12 or 14 | Twin turboprop engine monoplane airliner |
| Beechcraft Model 1900 | 1982 | 695 | Twin turboprop engine monoplane airliner |
| Beechcraft Model 2000 Starship | 1986 | 53 | Twin turboprop engine monoplane business aircraft |
| Beechcraft Model 3000 Texan II | 1998 | 900 | Single turboprop engine monoplane trainer |

== Other products ==
- Beechcraft Plainsman – Post-World War II automobile that reached the prototype stage before being cancelled
