= Plainsman =

Plainsman or The Plainsman may refer to:

Films:

- The Plainsman, a 1936 Western film starring Gary Cooper and Jean Arthur
- The Plainsman (1966 film), a Technicolor remake of the 1936 film

Television:

- Law of the Plainsman, a 1959-1960 half-hour Western series starring Michael Ansara.

Newspapers:

- Plainsman (South Africa), a local newspaper
- Plainsman (South Dakota), a newspaper in Huron, South Dakota, United States
- Kanto Plainsman, a United States Air Force newspaper out of Tachikawa Air Base, Tokyo, Japan, from 1961 to 1970
- The Auburn Plainsman, the student-run newspaper of Auburn University in Auburn, Alabama, United States

Vehicles:

- Chrysler Plainsman (1957–1959), the station wagon version of the Australian Chrysler Royal automobile
- Beechcraft Plainsman, a car made in 1946 by the Beech Aircraft Company

Other uses:

- The Plainsman Museum, Aurora, Nebraska, United States
- The Plainsman, a comic book mutant, part of Team Tejas
