= Air Command Commander Side-By-Side =

American autogyro

Commander Side-By-Side

General information
- Type: Autogyro
- National origin: United States
- Manufacturer: Air Command International
- Status: In production (2012)

History
- Developed from: Air Command Commander

The Air Command Commander Side-By-Side is an American autogyro designed and produced by Air Command International of Caddo Mills, Texas. The aircraft is supplied as a kit for amateur construction.

== Design and development ==
The Commander Side-By-Side provides an unusual gyroplane design in that it has side-by-side configuration seating. The gyroplane was designed to comply with the US Experimental - Amateur-built rules. It features a single main rotor, a two-seat open cockpit without a windshield, tricycle landing gear and a four-cylinder, air-cooled, four-stroke, 115 hp (86 kW) Subaru EJ22 automotive conversion engine in pusher configuration driving the propeller though a Gilmer belt reduction drive.

The aircraft's 29 ft (8.8 m) diameter Rotordyne rotor has a chord of 8 in (20.3 cm). The Side-By-Side has an empty weight of 485 lb (220 kg) and a gross weight of 926 lb (420 kg), giving a useful load of 441 lb (200 kg). Optional equipment available includes a folding mast, hydraulic wheel brakes and an electric trim system.

== Specifications (Commander Side-By-Side) ==
Data from Bayerl

General characteristics

- Crew: one
- Capacity: one passenger
- Empty weight: 485 lb (220 kg)
- Gross weight: 926 lb (420 kg)
- Fuel capacity: 10 U.S. gallons (38 L; 8.3 imp gal)
- Powerplant: 1 × Subaru EJ22 four cylinder, air-cooled, four stroke automotive conversion, 115 hp (86 kW)
- Main rotor diameter: 29 ft 0 in (8.85 m)
- Propellers: 3-bladed composite

Performance

- Maximum speed: 99 mph (160 km/h, 86 kn)
- Cruise speed: 75 mph (120 km/h, 65 kn)

== See also ==
- List of rotorcraft
