= Air Command Tandem =

American autogyro

Commander Tandem

General information
- Type: Autogyro
- National origin: United States
- Manufacturer: Air Command International
- Status: In production (2012)

History
- Developed from: Air Command Commander; Air Command Commander Tandem

The Air Command Tandem is an American autogyro designed and produced by Air Command International of Caddo Mills, Texas. The aircraft is supplied as a kit for amateur construction or as a ready-to-fly aircraft.

== Design and development ==
The Tandem kit was designed to comply with the US Experimental - Amateur-built rules. It features a single main rotor, a two-place tandem seating open cockpit with a fairing and a windshield, tricycle landing gear and a four-cylinder, air-cooled, four-stroke, 115 hp (86 kW) Subaru EJ22 automotive conversion or 100 hp (75 kW) Rotax 912ULS four-stroke aircraft engine in pusher configuration.

The aircraft's 28 ft (8.5 m) diameter Rotordyne rotor has a chord of 8 in (20.3 cm). The Tandem has an empty weight of 489 lb (222 kg) and a gross weight of 908 lb (412 kg), giving a useful load of 418 lb (190 kg).

== Specifications (Tandem) ==
Data from Bayerl

General characteristics

- Crew: one
- Capacity: one passenger
- Empty weight: 489 lb (222 kg)
- Gross weight: 908 lb (412 kg)
- Fuel capacity: 9 U.S. gallons (34 L; 7.5 imp gal)
- Powerplant: 1 × Rotax 912ULS four cylinder, air and liquid-cooled, four stroke aircraft engine, 100 hp (75 kW)
- Main rotor diameter: 28 ft 0 in (8.53 m)
- Propellers: 3-bladed composite

Performance

- Maximum speed: 109 mph (176 km/h, 95 kn)
- Cruise speed: 84 mph (135 km/h, 73 kn)

== See also ==
- List of rotorcraft
