= Aviation Unmanned Vehicle Museum =

- Location within Texas
- Established: 2021
- Location: Caddo Mills, Texas
- Coordinates: 33.038°N 96.240°W
- Type: Aviation museum
- Founder: Lt. Col. Harold F. "Red" Smith
- Website: www.auvm.net

The Aviation Unmanned Vehicle Museum is an aviation museum located at the Caddo Mills Municipal Airport in Caddo Mills, Texas focused on the history of unmanned aerial vehicles.

== History ==
A few years after retiring from the United States Air Force, Lt. Col. Harold F. "Red" Smith began a drone manufacturing business. Over the years, he gathered a collection of various drones in a 22,500 sq ft (2,090 m^{2}) building at the Caddo Mills Municipal Airport. By 2014, he began raising funds to establish a museum. However, Smith was killed in a car accident in 2017. His family continued the project and the museum opened to the public on 16 May 2021.

== Collection ==
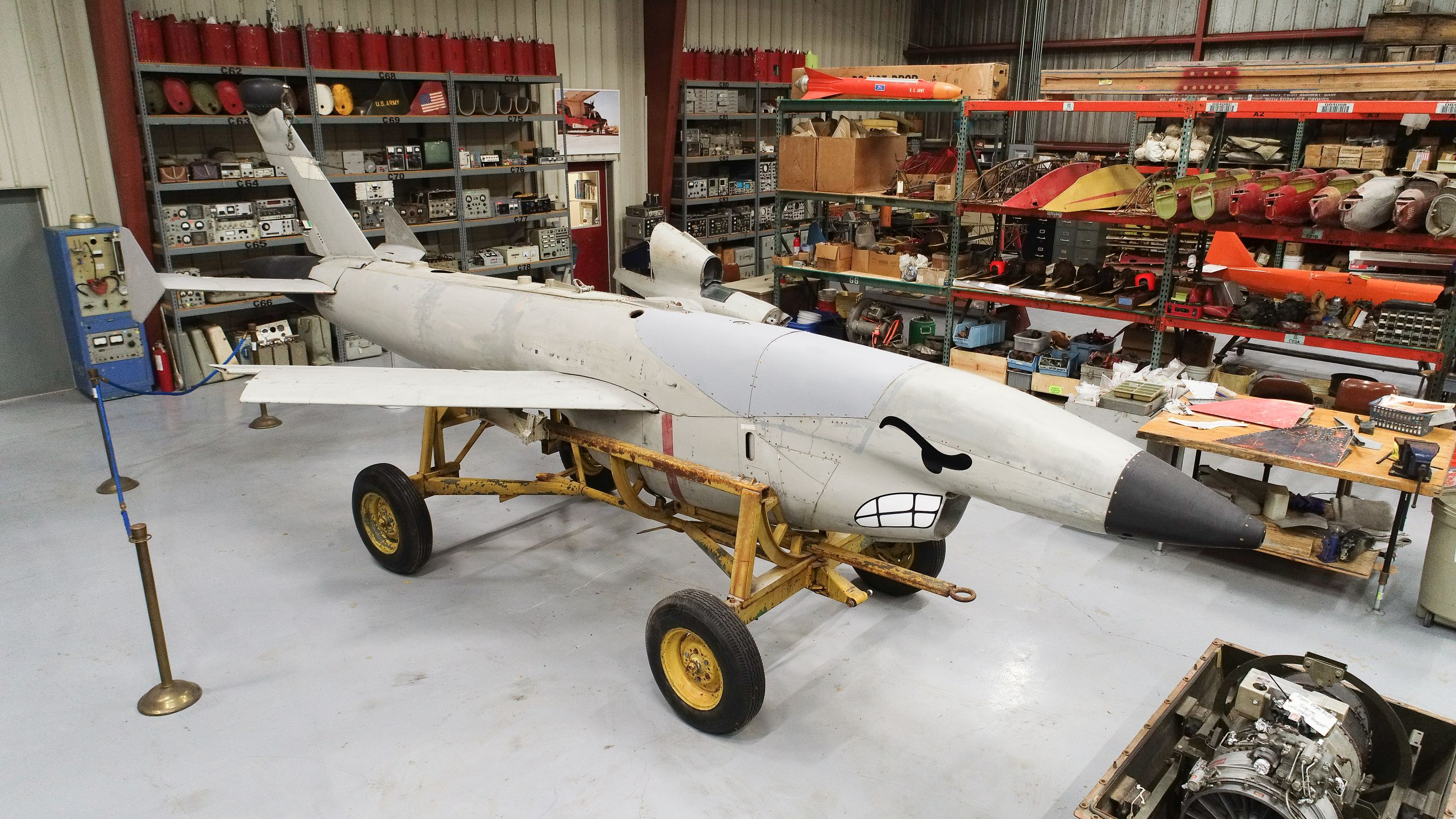
Ryan BGM-34B Firebee

- Beechcraft AQM-37 Jayhawk
- Beechcraft MQM-61 Cardinal
- Culver PQ-14 Cadet
- General Atomics MQ-1B Predator
- Gyrodyne QH-50 DASH
- Hayes TRX
- Lockheed X-7A
- Northrop BQM-74 Chukar
- Northrop KD2R5
- Radioplane MQM-57 Falconer
- Radioplane OQ-2
- Ryan BGM-34B Firebee

== See also ==
- List of aviation museums
