= Caddo Mills High School =

Coordinates: 33.0795°N 96.2288°W

Location
- 3049 FM 36; Caddo Mills, Texas 75135-0160; United States

Information
- School type: Public high school
- School district: Caddo Mills Independent School District
- Principal: Boe Parr
- Teaching staff: 57.63 (FTE)
- Grades: 9-12
- Enrollment: 733 (2023–2024)
- Student to teacher ratio: 12.72
- Colors: Green, black, and white
- Athletics conference: UIL Class AAAA
- Mascot: Fox
- Website: Caddo Mills High School website

Caddo Mills High School is a public school in Caddo Mills, Texas, United States. It is part of the Caddo Mills Independent School District. In 2013, the school was rated "Met Standard" by the Texas Education Agency. The growth of nearby Dallas and Caddo Mills itself has caused a rise in enrollment in recent years.
