= Q12 =

Q12 may refer to:

- Q12 (New York City bus)
- Beechcraft Q-12, an air-launched supersonic target drone
- The Quorum of the Twelve, a leadership organization within the Church of Jesus Christ of Latter-day Saints
- Yusuf (surah), of the Quran
