= Air Command Commander Elite =

American autogyro

Commander Elite
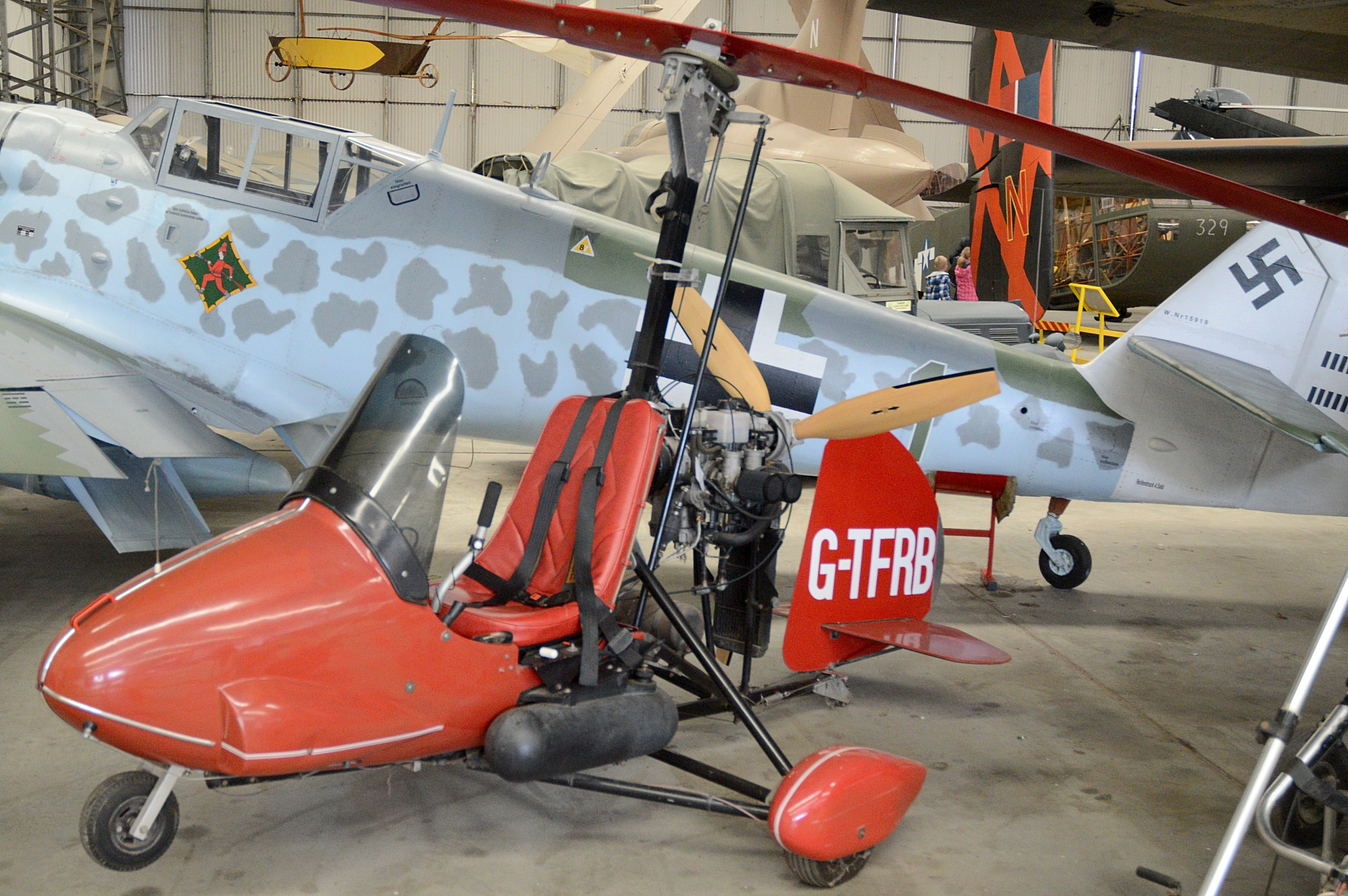

General information
- Type: Autogyro
- National origin: United States
- Manufacturer: Air Command International
- Status: Production completed

History
- Developed from: Air Command Commander

The Air Command Commander Elite is an American autogyro that was designed and produced by Air Command International of Caddo Mills, Texas. When it was available, the aircraft was supplied as a kit for amateur construction or as a conversion kit for the earlier Air Command Commander.

As of 2012, the design is no longer advertised for sale by the company.

== Design and development ==
The Commander Elite improves on the original Commander in that it has raised landing gear that positions the engine thrustline vertically at the center of gravity, eliminating changes in pitch with throttle changes. The gyroplane was designed to comply with the US Experimental - Amateur-built rules. It features a single main rotor, a single-seat open cockpit without a windshield, tricycle landing gear, and a twin cylinder, two-stroke, liquid-cooled, dual-ignition 64 hp (48 kW) Rotax 582 engine in pusher configuration.

The aircraft's 23 ft (7.0 m) diameter Rotordyne rotor has a chord of 8 in (20.3 cm). The rudder and tailplane are made from carbon fiber. The Commander Elite has a typical empty weight of 270 lb (122 kg) and a gross weight of 570 lb (259 kg), giving a useful load of 300 lb (140 kg).

== Operational history ==
By December 2012, ten examples had been registered in the United States with the Federal Aviation Administration.

== Specifications (Commander Elite) ==
Data from Bayerl

General characteristics

- Crew: one
- Empty weight: 269 lb (122 kg)
- Gross weight: 569 lb (258 kg)
- Fuel capacity: 9 U.S. gallons (34 L; 7.5 imp gal)
- Powerplant: 1 × Rotax 582 twin cylinder, liquid-cooled, two stroke aircraft engine, 64 hp (48 kW)
- Main rotor diameter: 23 ft 0 in (7.01 m)
- Propellers: 3-bladed composite

Performance

- Maximum speed: 75 mph (120 km/h, 65 kn)
- Cruise speed: 55 mph (88 km/h, 48 kn)
- Disk loading: 1.4 lb/sq ft (6.7 kg/m^{2})

== See also ==
- List of rotorcraft
