= Beechcraft MQM-61 Cardinal =

Target drone designed by Beechcraft

MQM-61 Cardinal
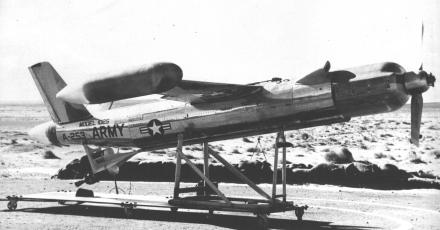

General information
- Type: Target drone
- National origin: United States
- Manufacturer: Beechcraft

The MQM-61 Cardinal is a target drone designed and built by Beechcraft.

== Development ==
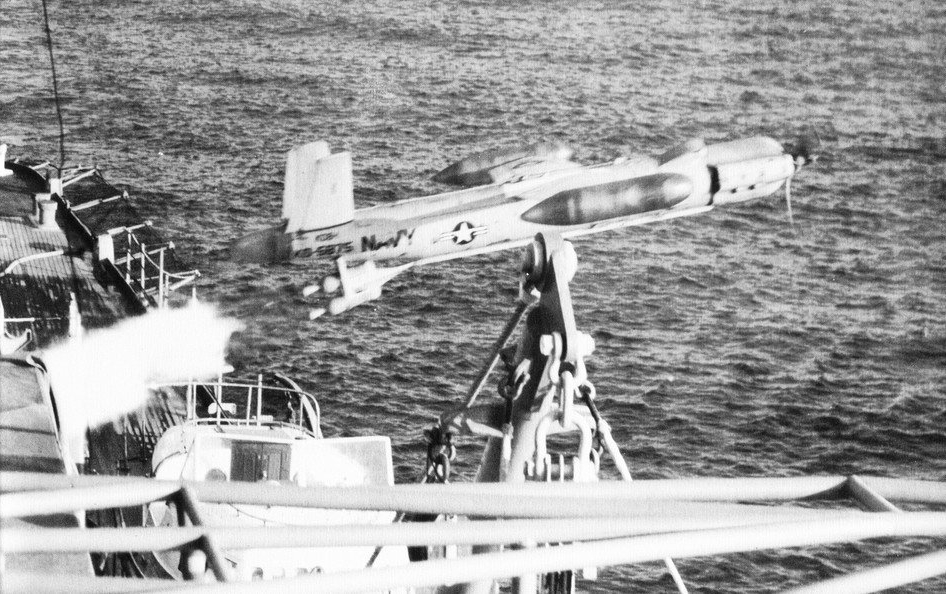
A KDB-1 is launched from USS Boston

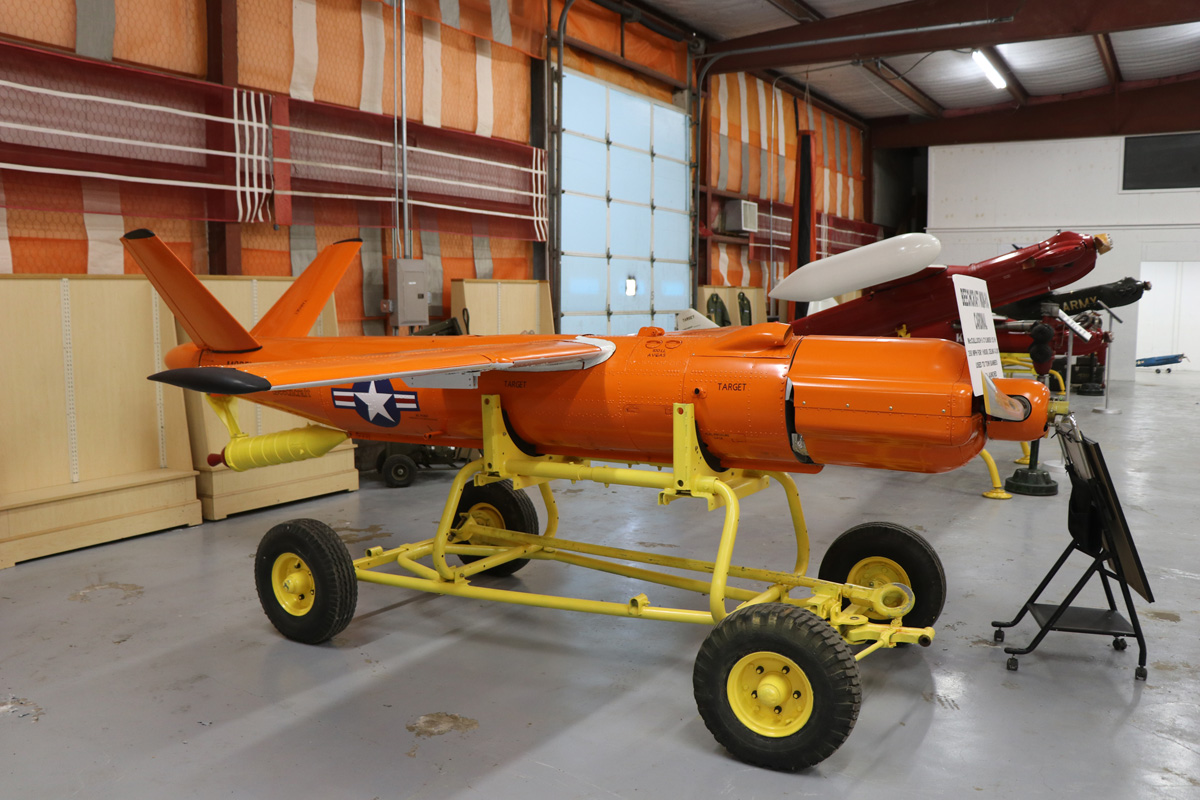
An MQM-61 on display at Aviation Unmanned Vehicle Museum

An MQM-61 on display at the USS Alabama Battleship Memorial Park

While the Radioplane BTT was a popular piston-powered target, such a simple target was relatively easy to build and it developed competition. In 1955 Beechcraft designed the Model 1001, as the initial version of this target drone was designated, in response to a US Navy requirement for gunnery and air-to-air combat training. Production of the type began in 1959, with the drone being given the Navy designation of KDB-1, later MQM-39A. The Model 1001 led to the similar Model 1025 for the US Army, which gave it the MQM-61A designation. Beech also designed a variant powered by a turbojet engine and designated Model 1025TJ, but nobody bought it.

The MQM-61A was a simple monoplane with a vee tail. It was substantially larger than the MQM-36 Shelduck, and powered by a 94 kW (125 hp) McCulloch TC6150-J-2 flat-six, air-cooled, two-stroke piston engine driving a two-blade propeller. It could tow banners or targets of its own, with two targets under each wing, and also carried scoring devices. Launch was by RATO booster, recovery was by parachute.

A total of 2,200 Cardinals of all variants were built, the majority for the US Army, with the rest operated by the US Navy, the US Marine Corps.

== Variants ==
Model 1001
Designated KDB-1 by the US Navy, later redesignated MQM-39A.
Model 1013
Development of the Model 1001 for aerial reconnaissance powered by a six-cylinder 110 hp (82 kW) McCulloch engine.
Model 1025
Designated MQM-61A by the US Army.
Model 1025TJ
Proposed turbojet-powered variant of the Model 1025.

== Surviving aircraft ==
- MQM-61 on display at the Aviation Unmanned Vehicle Museum in Caddo Mills, Texas.

== Specifications (MQM-61A) ==
General characteristics

- Crew: None
- Length: 15 ft 1 in (4.60 m)
- Wingspan: 13 ft 0 in (3.95 m)
- Height: 3 ft 4 in (1.02 m)
- Gross weight: 664 lb (301 kg)
- Powerplant: 1 × McCulloch TC6150-J-2 , 125 hp (94 kW)

Performance

- Maximum speed: 350 mph (560 km/h, 300 kn)
- Endurance: 1 hours
- Service ceiling: 43,000 ft (13,100 m)
