= Air Command Commander 147A =

American homebuilt autogyro

Commander 147A

General information
- Type: Autogyro
- National origin: United States
- Manufacturer: Air Command International
- Status: Production completed
- Number built: one

The Air Command Commander 147A was an American autogyro that was designed and produced by Air Command International when it was located in Wylie, Texas. Now out of production, the aircraft was intended to be supplied as a kit for amateur construction.

The only example known to have been registered with the Federal Aviation Administration (FAA) was the factory prototype, which was destroyed in a fatal test flight crash in Caddo Mills, Texas in July 1998.

== Design and development ==
The Commander 147A was designed to comply with the US homebuilt aircraft rules. It featured a Skywheels single main rotor, a two-seats-in side-by-side configuration enclosed cockpit, tricycle landing gear with wheel pants, plus a small tail caster and a Mazda 13B Wankel engine 160 hp (119 kW) engine in pusher configuration.

The aircraft fuselage was made from bolted-together aluminum tubing with a fiberglass fairing. Its two-bladed rotor had a diameter of 31.00 ft (9.4 m). The aircraft had a standard empty weight of 700 lb (318 kg) and a gross weight of 1,500 lb (680 kg), giving a useful load of 800 lb (363 kg).

Factory options included a long-range fuel tank, electric trim and a main rotor pre-rotator.

== Operational history ==
The factory prototype, serial number 001, registration number N147GY, suffered a loss of rotor RPM while maneuvering over a runway at Caddo Mills Municipal Airport during a factory test flight on 15 July 1998. The rotor blades struck the tail boom, and the aircraft descended and impacted the ground in a nose-low attitude. A post-crash fire consumed the main wreckage, and the pilot, who was the sole occupant, was killed. The accident was attributed to "the pilot's failure to maintain rotor rpm while maneuvering, which resulted in the main rotor blades contacting the tail section of the gyroplane."

By May 2018, no examples were registered in the United States, with only N147GY listed as having been registered at one time; it is listed as "destroyed".

== Specifications (Commander 147A) ==
Data from Purdy

General characteristics

- Crew: one
- Capacity: one passenger
- Length: 14 ft 0 in (4.27 m)
- Empty weight: 700 lb (318 kg)
- Gross weight: 1,500 lb (680 kg)
- Powerplant: 1 × Mazda 13B Wankel engine automotive engine, 160 hp (120 kW)
- Main rotor diameter: 31 ft 0 in (9.45 m)
- Main rotor area: 754 sq ft (70.0 m^{2})
- Propellers: 2-bladed Warp Drive Inc ground adjustable pitch, 5 ft 8 in (1.73 m) diameter

Performance

- Maximum speed: 120 mph (190 km/h, 100 kn)
- Cruise speed: 85 mph (137 km/h, 74 kn)
- Disk loading: 1.98 lb/sq ft (9.7 kg/m^{2})

== See also ==
- List of rotorcraft
