= Air Command Commander Sport =

Commander Sport

General information
- Type: Autogyro
- National origin: United States
- Manufacturer: Air Command International
- Status: Production completed
- Number built: At least one

History
- Developed from: Air Command Commander

The Air Command Commander Sport is an American autogyro that was designed and produced by Air Command International of Wylie, Texas. Now out of production, when it was available the aircraft was supplied as a kit for amateur construction.

== Design and development ==
The Commander Sport was designed to comply with the US Experimental - Amateur-built aircraft rules. It features a single main rotor, a single-seat open cockpit with a small cockpit fairing with a windshield, tricycle landing gear with a steerable nose wheel and wheel pants, plus a tail caster. The standard engine supplied was the twin cylinder, liquid-cooled, two-stroke, dual-ignition 64 hp (48 kW) Rotax 582 engine in pusher configuration. The 50 hp (37 kW) Rotax 503 and 40 hp (30 kW) Rotax 447 engines were factory options.

The aircraft fuselage is made from metal tubing, while the fairing is fiberglass. Its two-bladed rotor has a diameter of 23.00 ft (7.0 m). The aircraft has a typical empty weight of 275 lb (125 kg) and a gross weight of 750 lb (340 kg), giving a useful load of 475 lb (215 kg). With full fuel of 9 U.S. gallons (34 L; 7.5 imp gal) the payload for the pilot and baggage is 421 lb (191 kg).

The standard day, sea level, no wind, take off with a 64 hp (48 kW) engine is 100 ft (30 m) and the landing roll is 5 ft (2 m).

Original factory kit options were a pre-rotator, cockpit fairing, wheels pants and long range fuel tank. The manufacturer estimated the construction time from the supplied kit as 30 hours and put completion time as 3–4 days work.

== Specifications (Commander Sport) ==
Data from Purdy

General characteristics

- Crew: one
- Length: 10.66 ft (3.25 m)
- Empty weight: 275 lb (125 kg)
- Gross weight: 750 lb (340 kg)
- Fuel capacity: 9 U.S. gallons (34 L; 7.5 imp gal)
- Powerplant: 1 × Rotax 582 twin cylinder, liquid-cooled, four stroke aircraft engine, 64 hp (48 kW)
- Main rotor diameter: 23.00 ft (7.01 m)
- Main rotor area: 415 sq ft (38.6 m^{2})
- Propellers: 3-bladed ground adjustable, composite

Performance

- Maximum speed: 95 mph (153 km/h, 83 kn)
- Cruise speed: 65 mph (105 km/h, 56 kn)
- Service ceiling: 15,000 ft (4,600 m)
- Rate of climb: 1,200 ft/min (6.1 m/s)
- Disk loading: 1.80 lb/sq ft (8.8 kg/m^{2})
