= Caddo Mills Independent School District =

School district in Texas, United States

Address
- 100 Fox Lane Caddo Mills, Texas, 75135; United States

District information
- Type: Public
- Grades: PK–12
- Schools: 6
- NCES District ID: 4812390

Students and staff
- Students: 3,073 (2025–2026)
- Teachers: 220.80 (on an FTE basis) (2025–2026)
- Staff: 217.40 (on an FTE basis) (2025–2026)
- Student–teacher ratio: 13.92 (2025–2026)

Caddo Mills Independent School District is a public school district based in Caddo Mills, Texas. The district serves students in southwestern Hunt County.

In 2009, the school district was rated "recognized" by the Texas Education Agency.

== Schools ==
- Caddo Mills High School (Grades 9–12)
- Caddo Mills Middle School (Grades 7–8)
- Caddo Mills Intermediate School (Grades 5-6)
- Griffis Elementary School (Grades PK-4)
- Kathy Kirkpatrick Elementary School (Grades PK-4)
- Lee Elementary School (Grades PK-4)
