= Fuji Flyer =

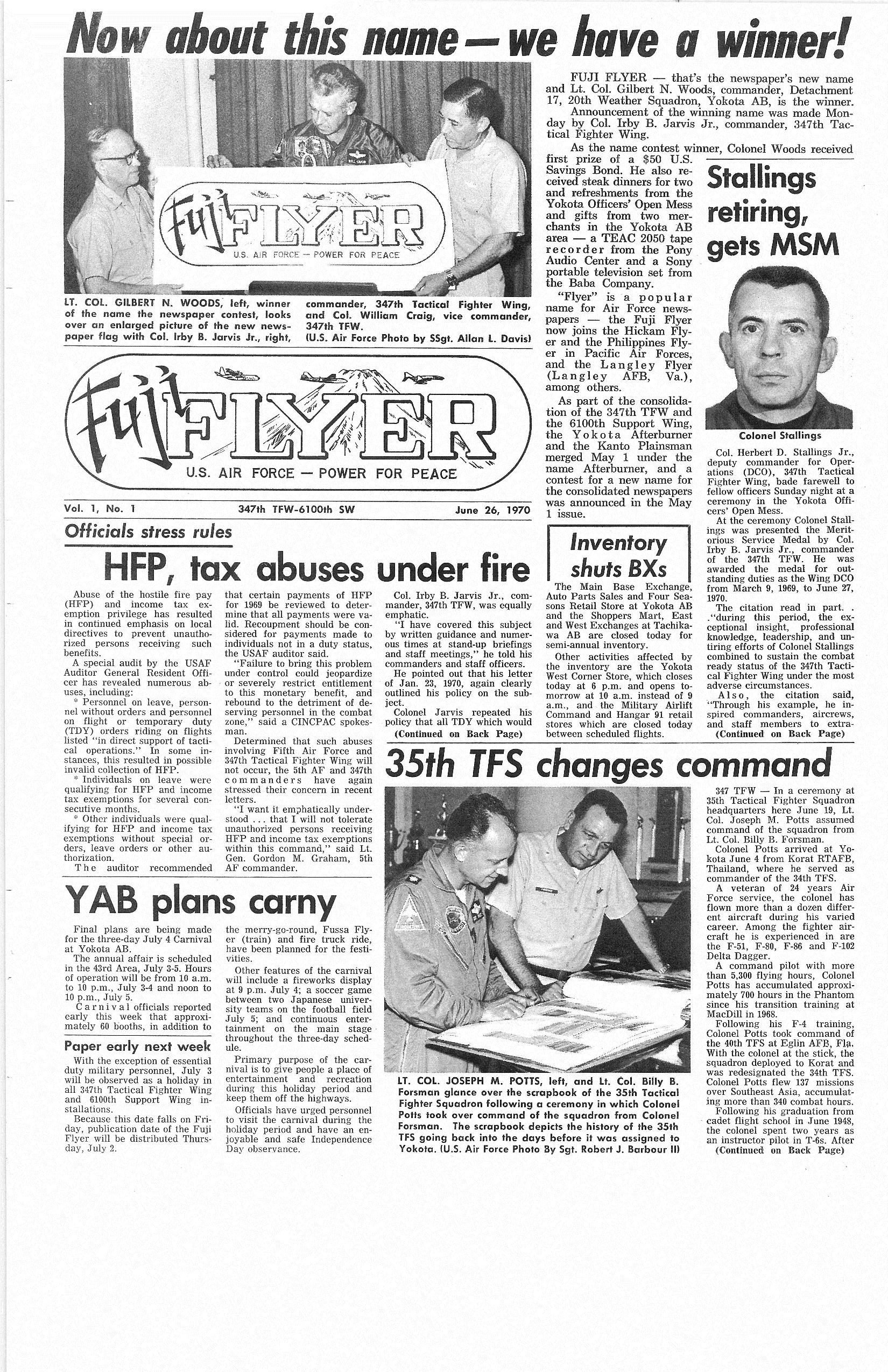
Cover of the inaugural issue of Fuji Flyer, Yokota Air Base, Japan

The Fuji Flyer was a free, official United States Air Force newspaper serving Yokota Air Base, Japan from June 1970 to June 2007. The air base wing public affairs office had full editorial control of the paper.

== History ==
=== Origins ===
The first issue of Fuji Flyer was Vol. 1 No. 1, published on 26 June 1970 when it replaced Yokota's former paper the Afterburner. Staff Sergeant Sam Jones was the paper's first editor. The name change reflected the merger of the former Tachikawa Air Base paper Kanto Plainsman with The Afterburner. Through Dec 1997 Fuji Flyer was a black and white command-sponsored Air Force publication that contained no advertisements and ranged from 8 to 12 pages per issue. In January 1998 the paper, while still an official publication, was turned over to a private company that began printing the cover in color and supported its effort through advertising.

=== Content ===
A typical issue of Fuji Flyer consisted of articles on significant and minor local events, individual and unit awards, ceremonies, sports, birth announcements, event and movie schedules, locally produced and wire cartoons and comic strips, as well as general Air Force information and stories. Most articles were accompanied by photographs. The paper was entirely in English with a target audience of Air Force personnel and dependents stationed at Yokota, and like all Air Force newspapers was intended as key source of command information. A Japanese-language version of the paper continues to be published for Japanese nationals working at the base.

=== The end of the Fuji Flyer ===
By the 2000s the paper, still supported by advertising, was printed in full color on slick paper. The final issue of Fuji Flyer, Vol. 48 No. 20 (the volume number here reflecting the Afterburner years as well), was published on 1 June 2007, almost exactly 37 years after the first issue appeared in a final edition of 5,500 copies. The editor of the paper at this time was Staff Sergeant Ruth Curfman. In an effort to save production cost and the work-hours necessary for physical production and distribution, it was announced that future news coverage of Yokota Air Force Base would subsequently be presented in an internet-only format through an official website.

Although another free paper called the Fuji Flyer later appeared at Yokota, it was chiefly an advertising flyer.
