= Air Command International =

Aircraft manufacturer

Air Command International, Inc.
- Company type: Privately held company
- Industry: Aerospace
- Founder: Dennis Fetters
- Headquarters: River Falls, Wisconsin, United States
- Products: Autogyro kit aircraft
- Website: aircommand.com

Air Command International, Inc. is an American aircraft manufacturer originally based in Wylie, Texas, later in Caddo Mills, Texas and now in River Falls, Wisconsin. The company specializes in the design and manufacture of autogyros in the form of kits for amateur construction for the US FAR 103 Ultralight Vehicles and the US Experimental - Amateur-built aircraft categories.

The company was founded by Dennis Fetters, who later went on to start the troubled Revolution Helicopter Corporation in Excelsior Springs, Missouri and Fetters Aerospace in China.

The Air Command Commander was introduced by the company in 1984 for the US FAR 103 Ultralight Vehicles category. Follow-up models included the single-seat Air Command Commander Elite, the single seat Air Command Commander Sport and Air Command Single Place, plus the two-seat Air Command Commander 147A, two seat Air Command Commander Side-By-Side, two seat Air Command Commander Tandem and two seat Air Command Tandem, all for the US homebuilt aircraft category.

All original Air Command kits used McCutchen Skywheels rotor blades, although other rotors have been flown by individual kit builders.

== Aircraft ==
Summary of aircraft built by Air Command International
Model name	First flight	Number built	Type
Air Command Commander	1984	2000+	Single seat autogyro
Air Command Commander 147A		at least one	Two seat autogyro
Air Command Commander Elite		at least 10	Single seat autogyro
Air Command Commander Side-By-Side		20	Two seat autogyro
Air Command Commander Sport		at least one	Single seat autogyro
Air Command Commander Tandem		at least two	Two seat autogyro
Air Command Tandem			Two seat autogyro
Air Command Single Place			Single seat autogyro
