= Beechcraft Model 16 =

American experimental training aircraft

Model 16

General information
- Type: Civil training monoplane
- National origin: United States
- Manufacturer: Beechcraft
- Number built: 1

History
- First flight: June 12, 1970

The Beechcraft Model 16 was an experimental American all-metal low-wing training monoplane designed and built by Beechcraft. The prototype, registered N9716Q, first flew on June 12, 1970, and was the only one built.
