= Caddo Mills Municipal Airport =

Municipal airport in Caddo Mills, Texas, United States

- IATA: none; ICAO: none; FAA LID: 7F3

Summary
- Airport type: Public
- Owner: City of Caddo Mills
- Serves: Caddo Mills, Texas
- Location: 4246 FM1565, Caddo Mills, TX 75135
- Elevation AMSL: 541.6 ft (165.1 m)
- Coordinates: 33°02′10″N 096°14′35″W

Map
- Location within Texas

Runways
Direction	Length		Surface
Direction	ft	m	Surface
13/31	4,000	1,219	Concrete
18/36	4,000	1,219	Concrete

Statistics (2015)
- Aircraft operations: 14,000
- Based aircraft: 17
- Sources: Federal Aviation Administration unless noted otherwise

Caddo Mills Municipal Airport (FAA LID: 7F3) is a city-owned public airport 2 nautical miles (3.7 km) southwest of the central business district of Caddo Mills, Texas, United States. The airport has no IATA or ICAO designation.

The airport is used solely for general aviation purposes, and has a history as an auto racing venue.

== History ==
The airfield was built during World War II as an auxiliary training field for the United States Army Air Forces. After the end of the war, the airfield was transferred to the city of Caddo Mills for civil use.

After the transfer of ownership, few aircraft used the airfield, and its disused runways became a popular site for races held by Dallas-area auto clubs. In 1951, drag races hosted at the airport by the Chaparral Roadster Club were drawing thousands of spectators. Soon afterwards, several other Dallas-area car clubs collaborated to form the North Texas Timing Association, which subsequently became affiliated with the National Hot Rod Association (NHRA), and the airfield became the first NHRA-sanctioned dragstrip in the region. In July 1952, the Sports Car Club of America scheduled two 50 mi (80 km) road races at the airfield, and the NHRA held its regional drag championships at the site in June 1956. The North Texas Timing Association continued to host NHRA drag races at the site through at least 1960 but the organization eventually vacated the site in favor of permanent dedicated dragstrips.

By 1997, the airfield was home to 7 hangars and 100 aircraft, but the two remaining runways had never been rehabilitated and had fallen into disrepair. That year, the city received an $843,000 grant to resurface the runways and add runway lighting, and gyroplane maker Air Command International announced that they would relocate all operations to the airport.

In 2000, Armadillo Aerospace used the airport as a testing base for their experimental reusable rocket-powered lunar landing module. The airport's simultaneous remote location and close proximity to the Dallas–Fort Worth metroplex were major factors in the company's decision to conduct experiments there.

In 2010, auto racing returned to the airport when an organization known as the Texas Speed Syndicate used a temporarily closed runway to host the Texas Invitational, a racing event styled after a street race over a 1,550 ft (470 m) course with a 60 mph (97 km/h) rolling start. The event was last held in October 2017.

== Facilities ==
Caddo Mills Municipal Airport covers 651 acres (263 ha) at an elevation of 541.6 ft (165.1 m) above mean sea level and has two runways:

- Runway 13/31: 4,000 x 150 ft. (1,219 x 46 m), Surface: Concrete
- Runway 18/36: 4,000 x 75 ft. (1,219 x 23 m), Surface: Concrete

For the year ending October 2, 2022, the airport had 14,000 aircraft operations, averaging 38 per day: 100% general aviation. 27 aircraft were then based at the airport: 25 single-engine, and 2 glider.

The Aviation Unmanned Vehicle Museum is located at the airport. The organization bills itself as the only museum dedicated to military drones.

The City of Caddo Mills has updated the Ramp on the East side and added 6 tie-downs. They have also installed a new Self-Serve Fueling System for 100LL Aviation Fuel.

== Accidents and incidents ==
- 5 February 1967: A Carrollton, Texas, man was killed when his homebuilt gyroplane overturned on landing at the airfield and was destroyed.
- 28 December 1985: A Cessna 172B, registration number N6876X, and a Pitts S-2B, registration number N5305A, collided in mid-air in the airfield traffic pattern. The Pitts pilot regained control and landed without injuries to himself or his passenger, but the Cessna crashed in a nearby field, killing both occupants. The accident occurred late in the afternoon when there was considerable sun glare in the traffic pattern; investigators found that the position of the sun made it difficult for occupants on the Cessna to see the Pitts, while "restricted visibility" made it difficult for the pilot of the Pitts to see the Cessna. The National Transportation Safety Board (NTSB) attributed the accident to the failure of both pilots to maintain visual separation from other aircraft. Contributing factors were sun glare, the failure of the Cessna pilot to correctly follow visual flight rules, and restricted visibility in the Pitts.
- 15 July 1998: While maneuvering over a runway during a test flight, the rotor blades of an Air Command Commander 147A gyroplane, registration number N147GY, struck the tail boom; the aircraft struck the ground in a nose-low attitude and was consumed in a post-crash fire, killing the pilot and sole occupant. The NTSB attributed the accident to "The pilot's failure to maintain rotor rpm while maneuvering, which resulted in the main rotor blades contacting the tail section of the gyroplane."
- 7 August 2023: The pilot and sole occupant of a Cessna 150 was killed when the plane crashed on takeoff around 3:30 pm. The NTSB, Federal Aviation Administration, and Texas Department of Public Safety (DPS) initiated investigations; a DPS spokesperson said that the aircraft experienced "some sort of mechanical issue", but did not specify what the issue was.

== See also ==
- List of airports in Texas
