= Beechcraft AQM-37 Jayhawk =

American supersonic target drone

AQM-37 Jayhawk
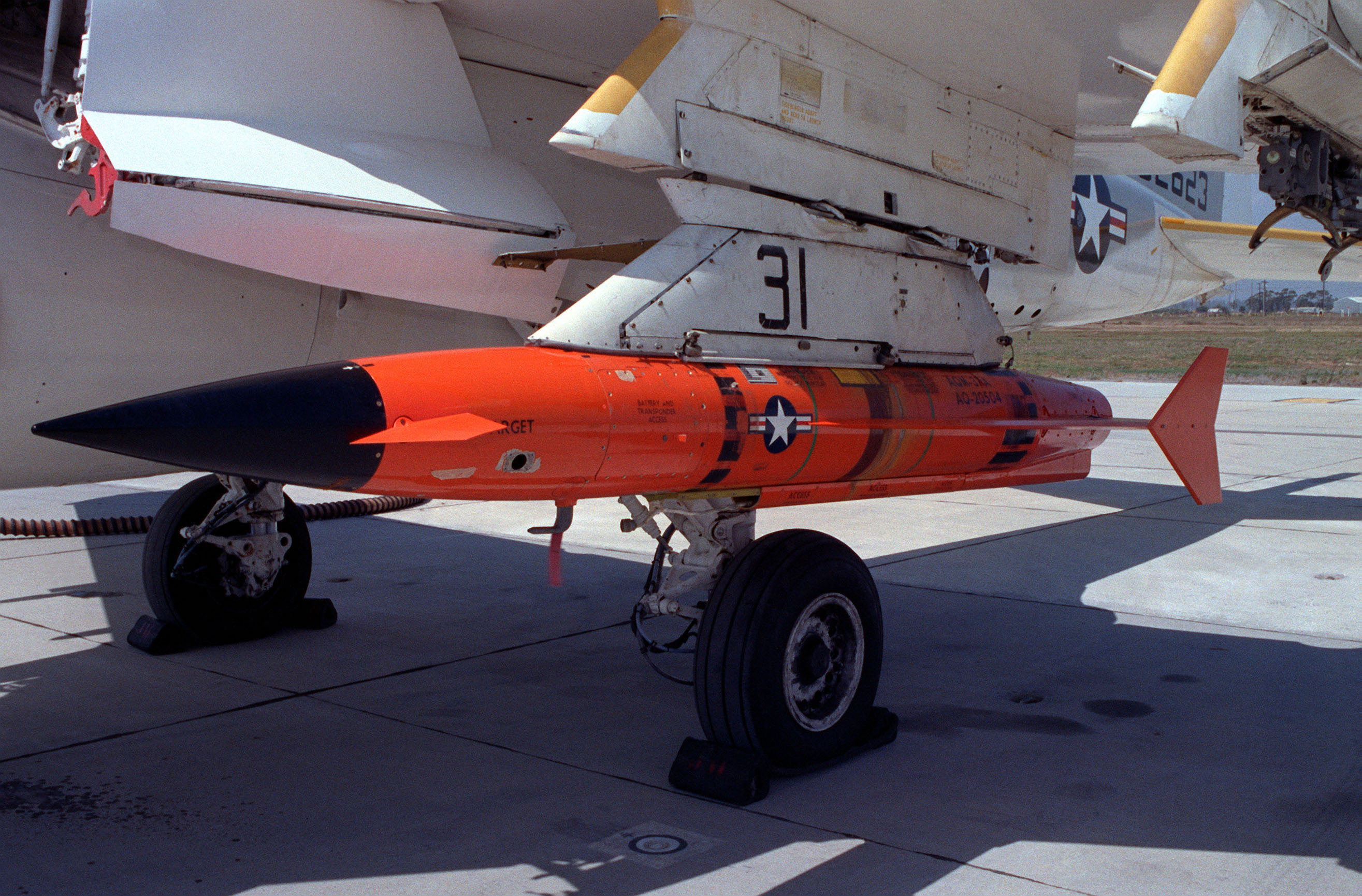
- An AQM-37A target under the wing of an A-6E Intruder.

General information
- Type: Unmanned aerial vehicle drone
- Manufacturer: Beechcraft
- Primary users: US Navy United Kingdom
- Number built: 5,000+

History
- First flight: May 1961

The Beechcraft AQM-37 Jayhawk (originally designated KD2B and Q-12) is an air-launched supersonic target drone manufactured by Beechcraft capable of simulating inbound ICBM warhead packages for fleet shoot-down exercises.

== Development ==
=== AQM-37 ===
In 1959, the US Navy and US Air Force issued a joint request for a new high-speed expendable target. Beechcraft won the competition, and the result was a small delta-winged drone with wingtip fins and a liquid rocket motor, originally designated XKD2B-1 but now known as the AQM-37. The type first flew in May 1961, entered service with the US Navy in 1963, and launched its last two remaining targets in September 2022.

The original version was the AQM-37A or Beech Model 1019. The AQM-37A was followed by a wide-ranging list of subvariants, some of which were new production, others which were modifications of existing AQM-37s. These variants were intended to simulate different classes of threats, such as sea-skimming antiship missiles or high-altitude naval attack missiles, or provide better performance. One high-performance variant with improved thermal protection attained a speed of Mach 4.7 and an altitude of over 112,000 feet (34 kilometers) on a ballistic trajectory. The final US Navy variant was designated AQM-37C.

After an evaluation of the AQM-37A in the late 1960s, the US Army bought a small initial batch of Model 1100/1101 AQM-37As that, unlike other variants, were recoverable, using a parachute system. Some of this batch were intended for low-altitude operation and fitted with a radar altimeter, and others were intended for high-altitude operation and had a barometric altimeter. The Army later ordered over 400 improved non-recoverable Model 1102 variants of the AQM-37A.

The USAF evaluated the AQM-37 in the early 1970s but was slow to adopt it. Records of USAF procurement of the type are sketchy, but it does seem to be currently part of the Air Force target inventory. Small quantities of AQM-37s were also sold to Italy, Israel, and France, while Shorts in Britain built under licence several hundred of the type as the Shorts SD.2 Stiletto. The Meteor company of Italy built a number of AQM-37s under license.

All variants are air-launched, with the US Navy traditionally using the F-4 Phantom for the job, and the British using the Canberra.

More than 5,000 AQM-37 targets of all variants have been delivered since the early 1960s. On 22 September 2022 the U.S. Navy conducted the final AQM-37 target launch.

The AQM-37's engine is built by Rocketdyne, though in some sources it is credited to Harley Davidson, the motorcycle manufacturer, which appears to be due to a sequence of company buyouts. The engine uses storable hypergolic liquid propellants: inhibited red fuming nitric acid (IRFNA) as an oxidizer and MAF-4 as a fuel. MAF-4, also known as hydyne, is a mixture of 60% unsymmetrical dimethylhydrazine (UDMH) and 40% diethylenetriamine. MAF-4 has a higher density than pure UDMH, allowing to load more fuel into limited volume of fuel tank.

=== AQM-81A Firebolt ===
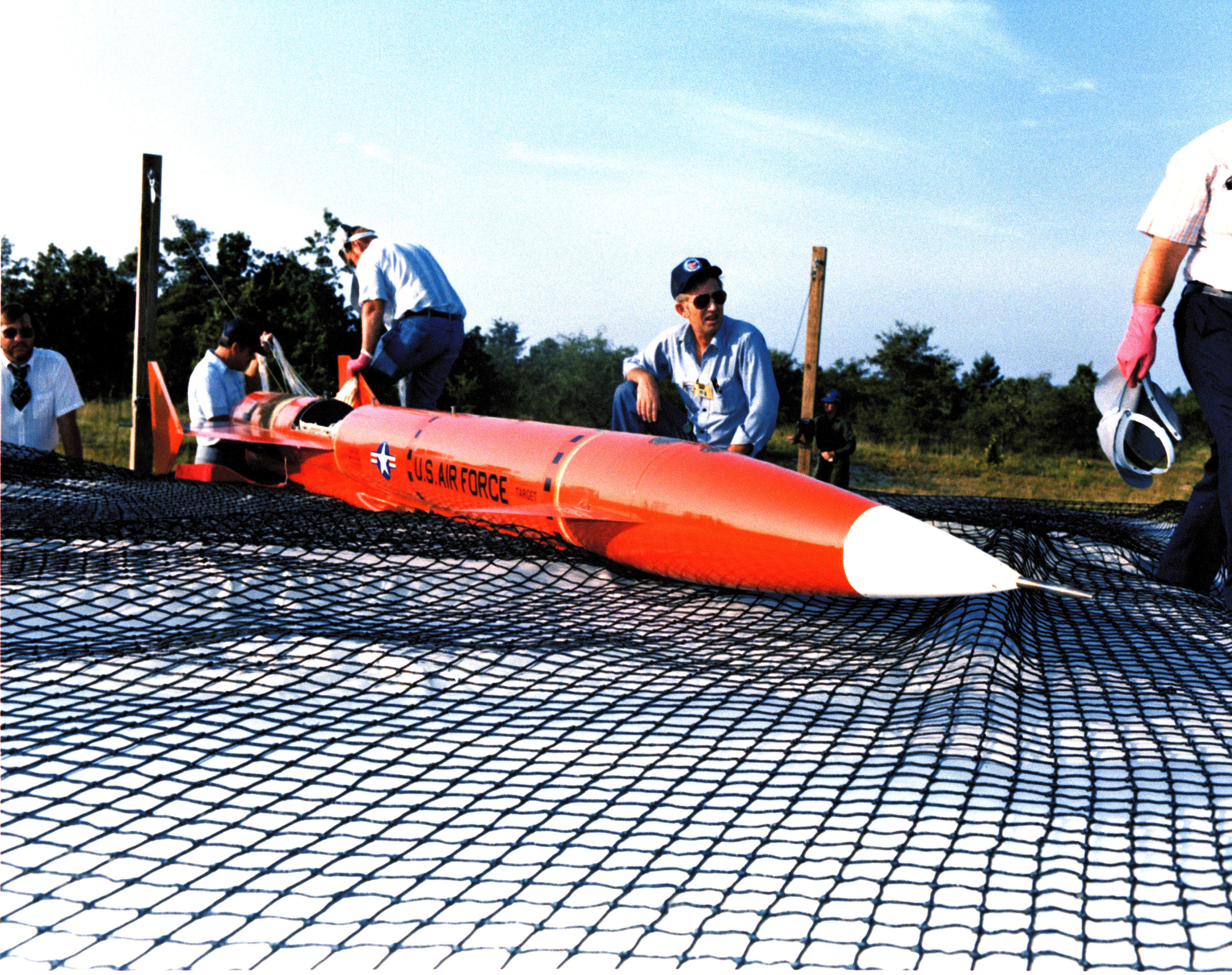
An AQM-81A Firebolt Model 305 high altitude, high speed target (HAHST) drone.

As a result, in the late 1960s the Air Force investigated an alternate propulsion scheme for the AQM-37 under project "Sandpiper". The program involved fitting a few AQM-37As with hybrid rocket engines that used solid fuel with storable nitric acid oxidizer. The tests were judged promising, and so the Air Force went on to establish a "High Altitude Supersonic Target (HAST)" program in the 1970s. HAST suffered various difficulties, and it wasn't until 1979 that a contract was awarded to Teledyne Ryan for the Model 305 / AQM-81A Firebolt.

The first Firebolt flew on 13 June 1983, launched from an Eglin AFB, Florida, F-4D Phantom II. The new target looked very much like the AQM-37, but had the hybrid rocket engine. The flight test program was completed, but then the HAST effort stalled completely, and the AQM-81A never went into production.

== Variants ==
Model 1019
Designated AQM-37A by the United States Military.
Model 1072
United Kingdom variant.
Short Stiletto
The Beech Model 1072 modified by Shorts for UK use.
Model 1088
Italian variant.
Model 1094
French variant.
Model 1100
Fitted with a two-stage recovery parachute for the US Army.
Model 1101
Fitted with a two-stage recovery parachute for the US Army.
Model 1102
(AQM-37A)Fitted non recoverable version for the US Army.
XKD2B-1
Prototype targets.
KD2B-1
US Navy designation before the joint designation scheme was introduced.
AQM-37A
Designation of the KD2B-1 after the joint designation system was introduced.
AQM-37B
Not officially used after orders from the US Navy were changed to the AQM-37C.
AQM-37C
US Navy
AQM-37D
Upgraded electrical systems and avionics for higher reliability.
Teledyne Ryan AQM-81A Firebolt
Developed for the USAF from the AQM-37 by introducing solid rocket fuel with liquid oxidiser (RFNA), for improved safety and performance. Beechcraft submissions were rejected as too expensive, so development contracts were awarded to Teledyne-Ryan
Teledyne Ryan AQM-81B
A US Navy version not pursued.
Q-12
US Air Force designation for the KD2B before the joint designation scheme was introduced.

== Surviving aircraft ==
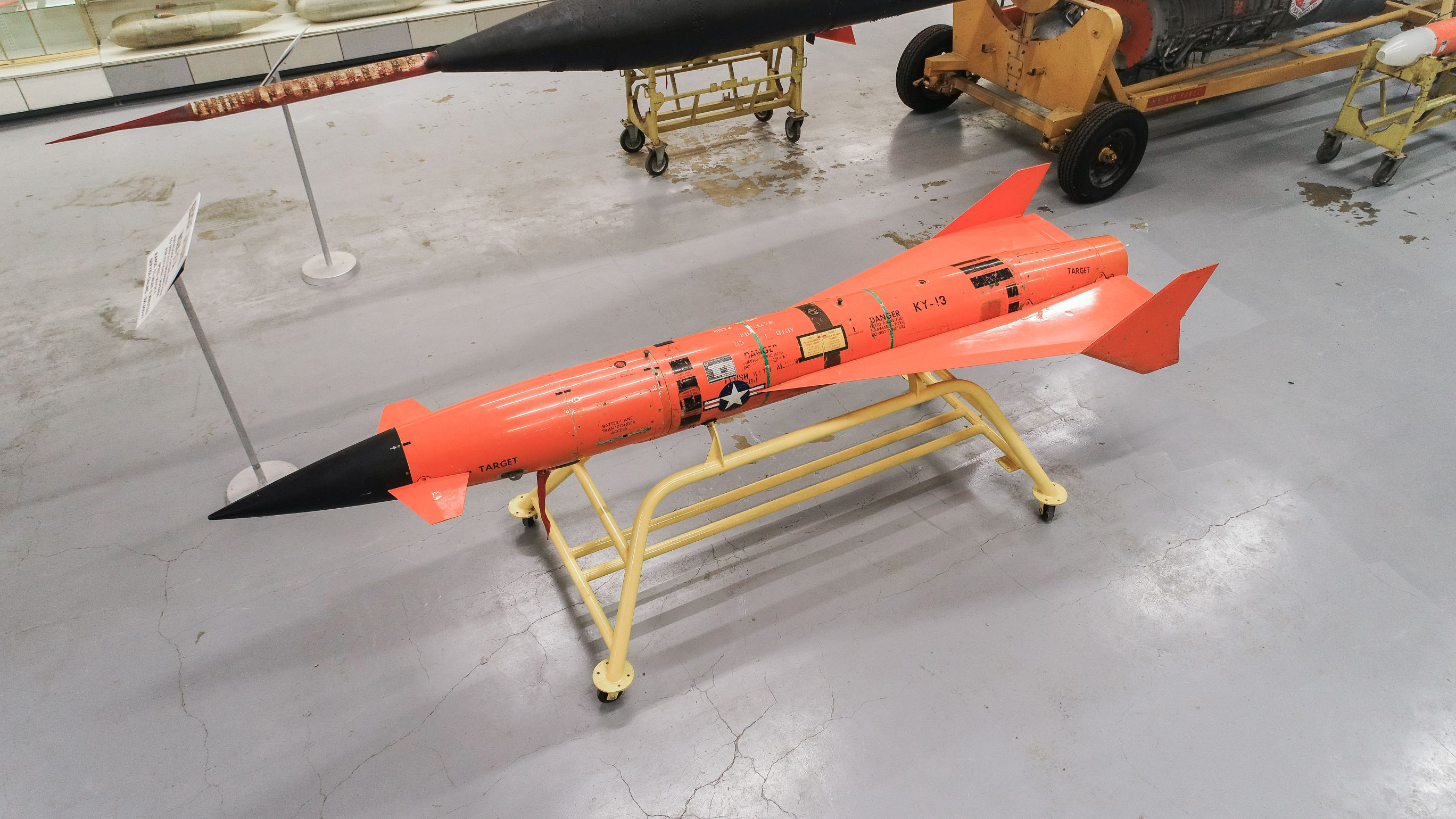
An AQM-37 on display at the Aviation Unmanned Vehicle Museum

- AQM-37 on display at the Aviation Unmanned Vehicle Museum in Caddo Mills, Texas.

== Operators ==
United Kingdom
United States

== Specifications (AQM-37C) ==
General characteristics

- Crew: 0
- Length: 14 ft 0 in (4.27 m)
- Wingspan: 3 ft 4 in (1.00 m)
- Height: 2 ft 2 in (0.66 m)
- Gross weight: 620 lb (280 kg)
- Powerplant: 1 × Rocketdyne LR64-NA-4 liquid-fueled rocket , 850 lbf (3.8 kN) thrust

Performance

- Maximum speed: Mach 4.0
- Range: 113 mi (180 km, 98 nmi)
- Endurance: 5 minutes
- Service ceiling: 100,000 ft (30,000 m)

== See also ==
- Target drone
