= Air Command Commander Tandem =

Commander Tandem

General information
- Type: Autogyro
- National origin: United States
- Manufacturer: Air Command International
- Status: Production completed
- Number built: At least two

History
- Developed from: Air Command Commander
- Variant: Air Command Tandem

The Air Command Commander Tandem is an American autogyro that was designed and produced by Air Command International of Wylie, Texas. Now out of production, when it was available the aircraft was supplied as a kit for amateur construction.

The design was later developed into the longer-landing gear equipped and heavier gross weight Air Command Tandem that remained in production in 2014.

== Design and development ==
The Commander Tandem was developed from the single-seat Air Command Commander and was designed to comply with the US Experimental - Amateur-built aircraft rules. It features a single main rotor, a two-seats-in tandem open cockpit with a small cockpit fairing with a windshield, tricycle landing gear with wheel pants, plus a tail caster and a twin cylinder, liquid-cooled, two-stroke, dual-ignition 64 hp (48 kW) Rotax 582 engine or Mazda powerplant in pusher configuration.

The aircraft fuselage is made from metal tubing. Its two-bladed rotor has a diameter of 25 ft (7.6 m). The aircraft has a typical empty weight of 330 lb (150 kg) and a gross weight of 790 lb (358 kg), giving a useful load of 460 lb (209 kg).

== Operational history ==
In June 2014 no examples were registered in the United States with the Federal Aviation Administration, although a total of two had been registered at one time.

== Specifications (Commander Tandem) ==
Data from Purdy

General characteristics

- Crew: one
- Capacity: one passenger
- Length: 15.41 ft (4.70 m)
- Empty weight: 330 lb (150 kg)
- Gross weight: 790 lb (358 kg)
- Powerplant: 1 × Rotax 582 twin cylinder, liquid-cooled, two stroke aircraft engine, 64 hp (48 kW)
- Main rotor diameter: 25 ft 0 in (7.62 m)
- Main rotor area: 490 sq ft (46 m^{2})
- Propellers: 3-bladed ground adjustable, composite

Performance

- Maximum speed: 90 mph (140 km/h, 78 kn)
- Cruise speed: 75 mph (121 km/h, 65 kn)
- Disk loading: 1.6 lb/sq ft (7.8 kg/m^{2})

== See also ==
- List of rotorcraft
