= Kanto Plainsman =

Consolidated United States Air Force newspaper

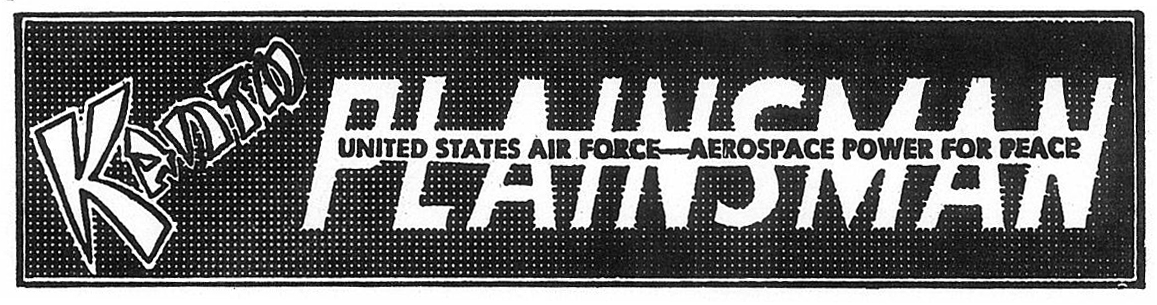
Flag of the Kanto Plainsman newspaper

The Kanto Plainsman was a consolidated United States Air Force newspaper out of Tachikawa Air Base from 1961 to 1970 covering news and events of that base, as well as Fuchu Air Station, Grant Heights Housing, Green Park Housing, Washington Heights Housing, Yamato Air Station, Showa Air Station, Iwo Jima, Marcus Island, Ofuna and other minor detached Air Force properties in Japan's Kanto Plain area. The only nearby base to retain its own newspaper was Yokota Air Base.

== Origins ==
The first issue, Vol. I no. 1, appeared on 30 June 1961, replacing Tachikawa's paper The Marauder and other separate base papers. The appearance of the Kanto Plainsman coincided with the activation of the 6100th Support Wing at Tachikawa. The free paper was an official Air Force publication that contained no advertisements and ranged from 12 to 20 pages per issue.

== Content ==
A typical issue consisted of articles on significant and minor local events, individual and unit awards, ceremonies, sports, birth announcements and event schedules, as well as general Air Force information and stories. Most articles were accompanied by photographs. The paper was entirely in English with a target audience of Air Force personnel and dependents stationed in Japan, and like all Air Force newspapers was intended as key source of command information. A Japanese-language version of the paper was published for Japanese nationals working at the above-mentioned American Air Force facilities.

== The End of the Kanto Plainsman ==
The final issue of Kanto Plainsman, Vol. X No. 16, was published on 24 April 1970. On that date it was merged with the Yokota Air Base newspaper The Afterburner, which was renamed the Fuji Flyer. The demise of Kanto Plainsman occurred soon after flying operations ceased at Tachikawa and the Air Force began its Kanto Plain Consolidation Program. MSgt George E. O'Brien was the Kanto Plainsman's editor for the final issues.
