= Beechcraft Plainsman =

American automobile produced by Beechcraft

The Beechcraft Plainsman was a concept car made in 1946 by the Beech Aircraft Company in Wichita, Kansas. The Plainsman was fitted with an air-cooled four-cylinder Franklin engine driving a generator, which in turn powered four electric motors, one for each wheel. It was fitted with fully independent air suspension. It also had an aluminum body. It weighed 2,200 pounds (1,000 kg), its top speed was 160 miles per hour (260 km/h), and could carry six passengers. Large windows and curved doors blended into the roof of the fastback design. Crash protection was built into the design. Only two were built.
