= Air Command Commander =

American homebuilt autogyro

Commander

General information
- Type: Autogyro
- National origin: United States
- Manufacturer: Air Command International
- Status: Production completed
- Number built: over 2,000

History
- First flight: 1984
- Variants: Air Command Commander Elite; Air Command Commander Tandem

The Air Command Commander is an American autogyro that was designed and produced by Air Command International, with its first flight in 1984. Production was completed by 2003. The aircraft was supplied as a kit for amateur construction.

== Design and development ==
The aircraft was designed to comply with the US FAR 103 Ultralight Vehicles rules, including the category's maximum empty weight of 254 lb (115 kg). The aircraft has a standard empty weight of 252 lb (114 kg). It features a single main rotor, a single-seat open cockpit without a windshield, tricycle landing gear and a single engine in pusher configuration.

The aircraft fuselage is made from bolted-together 6061-T6 aluminum tubing that is supplied anodized and pre-drilled. Its 23 ft (7.0 m) diameter rotor comes completely assembled.

The aircraft takes 40 hours to assemble from the factory kit. Original factory options included a cockpit fairing, wheels brakes, wheel pants, rotor brake and a main rotor pre-rotator, although the installation of any of these options will raise the empty weight above US FAR 103 limits for ultralight vehicles.

The aircraft can be readily loaded on a simple trailer for ground transportation.

Reviewer Andre Cliche said of the aircraft:

The Commander 447 is a highly maneuverable stick—and-rudder machine that can give lots of excitement to those pilots who like to explore their flying skills. Like all gyros, it can be trailered easily and the preflight setup time is said to be 15 minutes.

== Variants ==
Commander 447
Main version equipped with a single 40 hp (30 kW) twin cylinder, air-cooled, two-stroke single-ignition Rotax 447 engine

== Specifications (Commander 447) ==
Data from Cliche

General characteristics

- Crew: one
- Length: 10 ft 8 in (3.25 m)
- Width: 6 ft 0 in (1.83 m)
- Height: 7 ft 0 in (2.13 m)
- Empty weight: 252 lb (114 kg)
- Gross weight: 552 lb (250 kg)
- Fuel capacity: 5 U.S. gallons (19 L; 4.2 imp gal)
- Powerplant: 1 × Rotax 447 twin cylinder, air-cooled, two-stroke single-ignition aircraft engine, 40 hp (30 kW)
- Main rotor diameter: 23 ft 1 in (7.04 m)
- Propellers: 3-bladed composite, ground adjustable, 5 ft 0 in (1.52 m) diameter

Performance

- Maximum speed: 63 mph (101 km/h, 55 kn)
- Cruise speed: 50 mph (80 km/h, 43 kn)
- Range: 200 mi (320 km, 170 nmi)
- Service ceiling: 10,000 ft (3,000 m)
- Rate of climb: 800 ft/min (4.1 m/s)

== See also ==
- List of rotorcraft
