= Beechcraft =

Aircraft manufacturing subsidiary of Textron

Beechcraft Corporation
- Type: Brand
- Industry: General aviation
- Founded: 1932; 94 years ago
- Founders: Walter Beech; Olive Ann Beech; Ted A. Wells
- Headquarters: Wichita, Kansas, United States
- Products: List of models
- Parent: Raytheon Company (1980–2007); Goldman Sachs (2007–2014); Textron Aviation (2014–present)
- Website: beechcraft.txtav.com/en

Beechcraft is an American brand of civil aviation and military aircraft owned by Textron Aviation since 2014, headquartered in Wichita, Kansas. Originally, it was a brand of Beech Aircraft Corporation, an American manufacturer of general aviation, commercial, and military aircraft, ranging from light single-engined aircraft to twin-engined turboprop transports, business jets, and military trainers. Beech later became a division of Raytheon and then Hawker Beechcraft before a bankruptcy sale turned its assets over to Textron (parent company of Beech's historical cross-town Wichita rival, Cessna Aircraft Company). It remains a brand of Textron Aviation.

== History ==
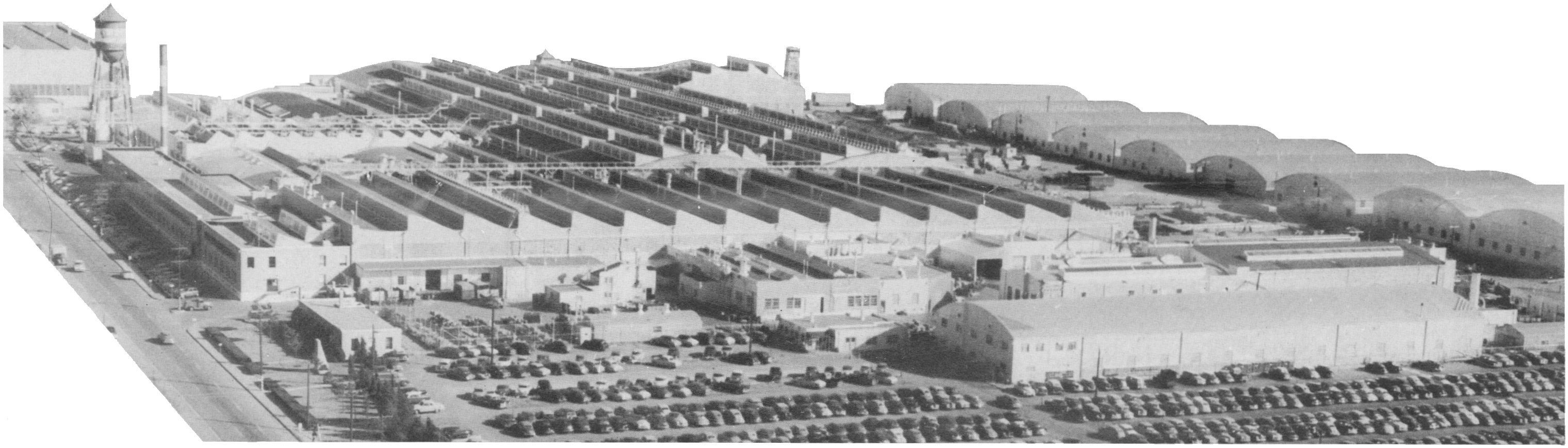
Main Beechcraft plant in Wichita, Kansas, circa 1956

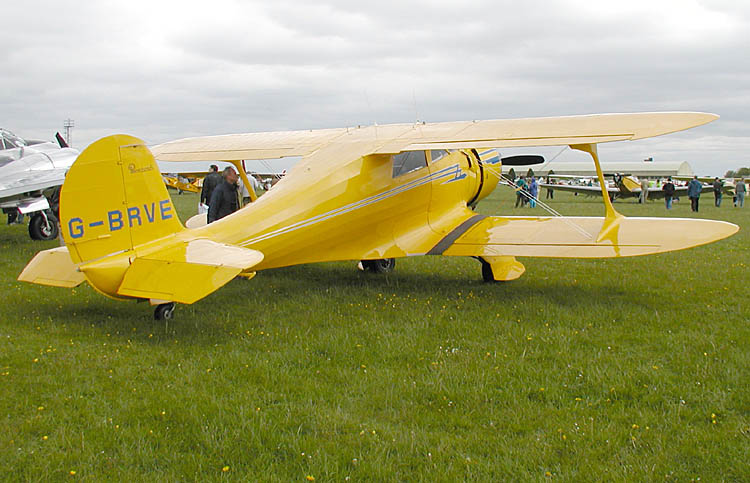
Beech D17S Staggerwing

Beech Aircraft Company was founded in Wichita, Kansas, in 1932 by Walter Beech as president, his wife Olive Ann Beech as secretary, Ted A. Wells as vice president of engineering, K. K. Shaul as treasurer, and investor C. G. Yankey as vice president. The company began operations in an idle Cessna factory. With designer Ted Wells, they developed the first aircraft under the Beechcraft name, the Beechcraft Model 17 Staggerwing, which flew in November 1932. Over 750 Staggerwings were built, including 352 for the United States Army Air Forces and 67 for the United States Navy during World War II.

Beechcraft was not Beech's first company, as he had previously helped form Travel Air in 1924 and the design sequence used at Beechcraft followed Travel Air's, which were continued at Curtiss-Wright, after Travel Air had been absorbed in 1929. Beech had become president of Curtiss-Wright's airplane division and VP of sales, but was dissatisfied with being distanced from aircraft production. He quit to form Beechcraft, using the original Travel Air facilities and employing many of the same people. Model numbers prior to 11/11000 were built under the "Travel Air" name, while Curtiss-Wright built the CW-12, 14, 15, and 16 as well as previous successful Travel Air models (mostly the model 4000/4).

In 1942 Beech won its first Army-Navy "E" Award production award and was among the five percent of war contracting firms to win five straight awards for production efficiency, mostly for the twin-engine Model 18 Expeditor transport which remains in widespread use worldwide.

After the war, the Staggerwing was replaced by the single-engined Bonanza monoplane, which featured a distinctive V-tail which was later dispensed with. It has remained in production since 1947, and has had the longest production run of any airplane. Other important Beech aircraft are the King Air and Super King Air line of twin-engined turboprops, in production since 1964, the Baron, a twin-engined variant of the Bonanza, and the Model 18 Expeditor.

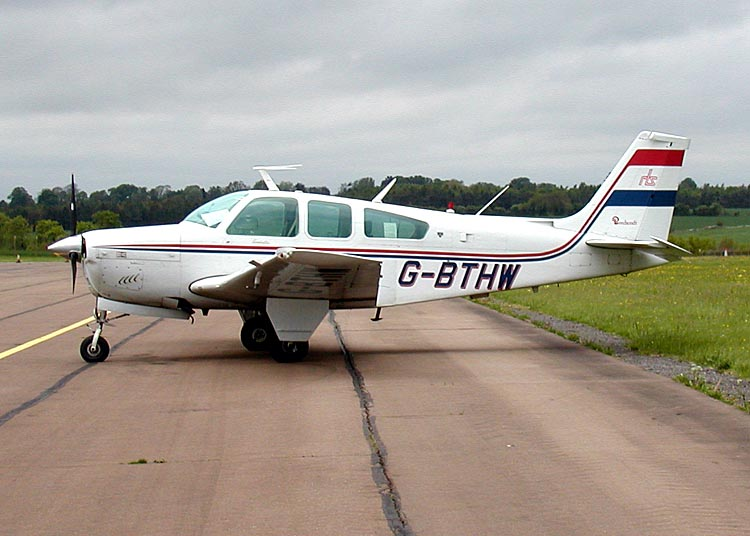
1978 Beech Bonanza F33C

In 1950, Olive Ann Beech took over as president and CEO, after her husband's death from a heart attack on November 29 of that year and continued as CEO until Beech was sold to Raytheon Company on February 8, 1980. Ted Wells was replaced as chief engineer by Herbert Rawdon, who remained until his retirement in the early 1960s.

In 1973, Beechcraft found Beechcraft Heritage Museum to host its historical aircraft.

In 1994, Raytheon merged Beechcraft with the Hawker product line it had acquired in 1993 from British Aerospace, forming Raytheon Aircraft Company. In 2002, the Beechcraft brand was revived to again designate the Wichita-produced aircraft. In 2006, Raytheon sold Raytheon Aircraft to Goldman Sachs creating Hawker Beechcraft. Since its inception Beechcraft has resided in Wichita, Kansas, also the home of chief competitors Cessna, Stearman and Learjet. Throughout much of the mid-to-late 20th century, Beechcraft was one of the "Big Three" in the field of general aviation manufacturing, along with Cessna and Piper.

The bankruptcy of Hawker Beechcraft on May 3, 2012, ended with its emergence on February 16, 2013, as a new entity, Beechcraft Corporation, with the Hawker Beechcraft name being retired. The new and much smaller company produces the King Air line of aircraft, the T-6/AT-6 military trainer/attack aircraft, as well as the single-engined Bonanza and twin-engined Baron. The jet line was discontinued, but the new company continues to support aircraft already produced.

By October 2013, the company, now financially sound, was up for sale.

On December 26, 2013, Textron purchased Beechcraft, including the discontinued Hawker jet line, for $1.4 billion. The sale was concluded in the first half of 2014, with government approval. Textron said that Beechcraft and Cessna would be combined to form a new light aircraft manufacturing concern, Textron Aviation, that would result in $65–85 million in annual savings over keeping the companies separate. Textron has however kept both the Beechcraft and Cessna names as separate brands.

== Products ==
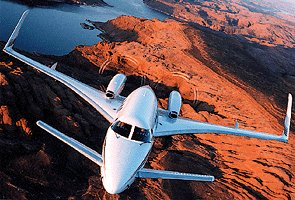
Beechcraft Model 2000 Starship

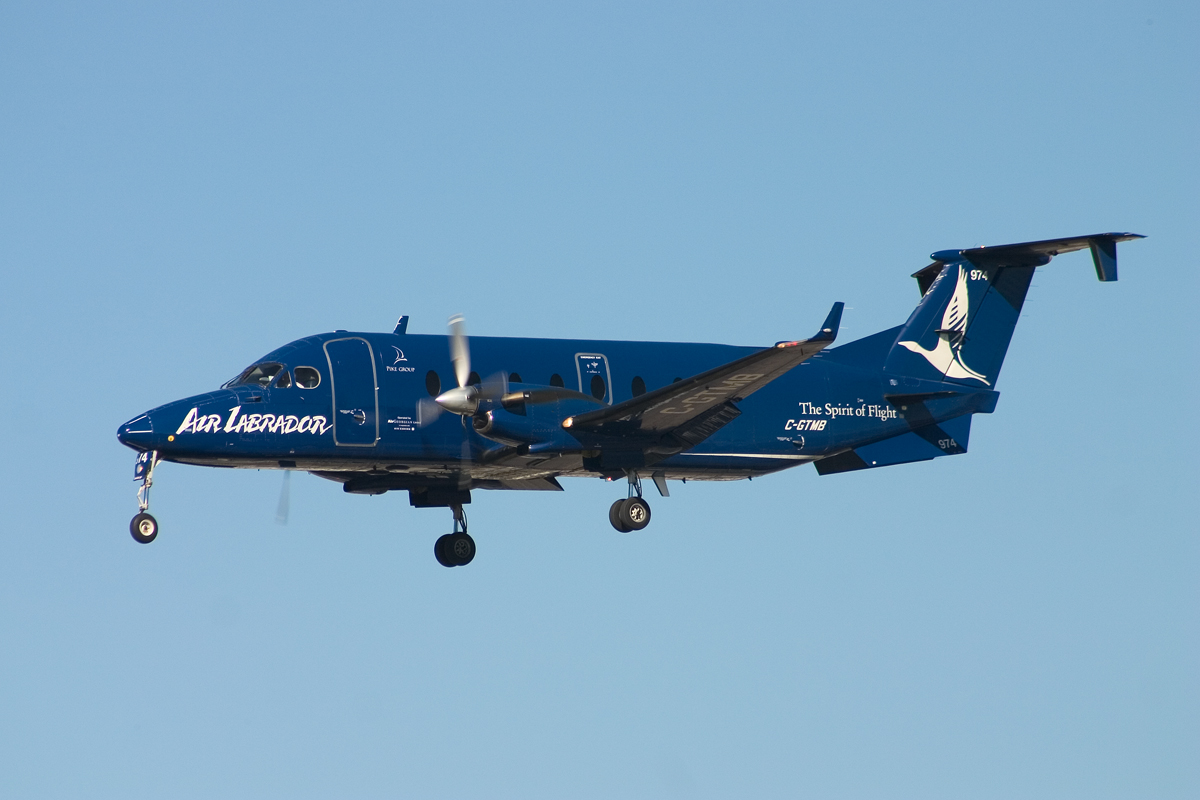
Beechcraft 1900D

As of July 2019, Textron Aviation was producing the following models under the Beechcraft brand name:

- Beechcraft Bonanza series – single-engined piston general aviation aircraft
- Beechcraft Baron – twin-engined piston utility aircraft
- Beechcraft Denali
- (Super) King Air
  - C-12 Huron (military version)
- Beechcraft T-6 Texan II/CT-156 Harvard II – single-engined turboprop military trainer, based on Pilatus PC-9

== Facilities ==
- Beech Factory Airport – houses Beechcraft's head office, manufacturing facility, and runway for test flights

== See also ==
- Beech Aircraft Corp. v. Rainey
- Hawker Aircraft
