= Caddo Mills, Texas =

- City
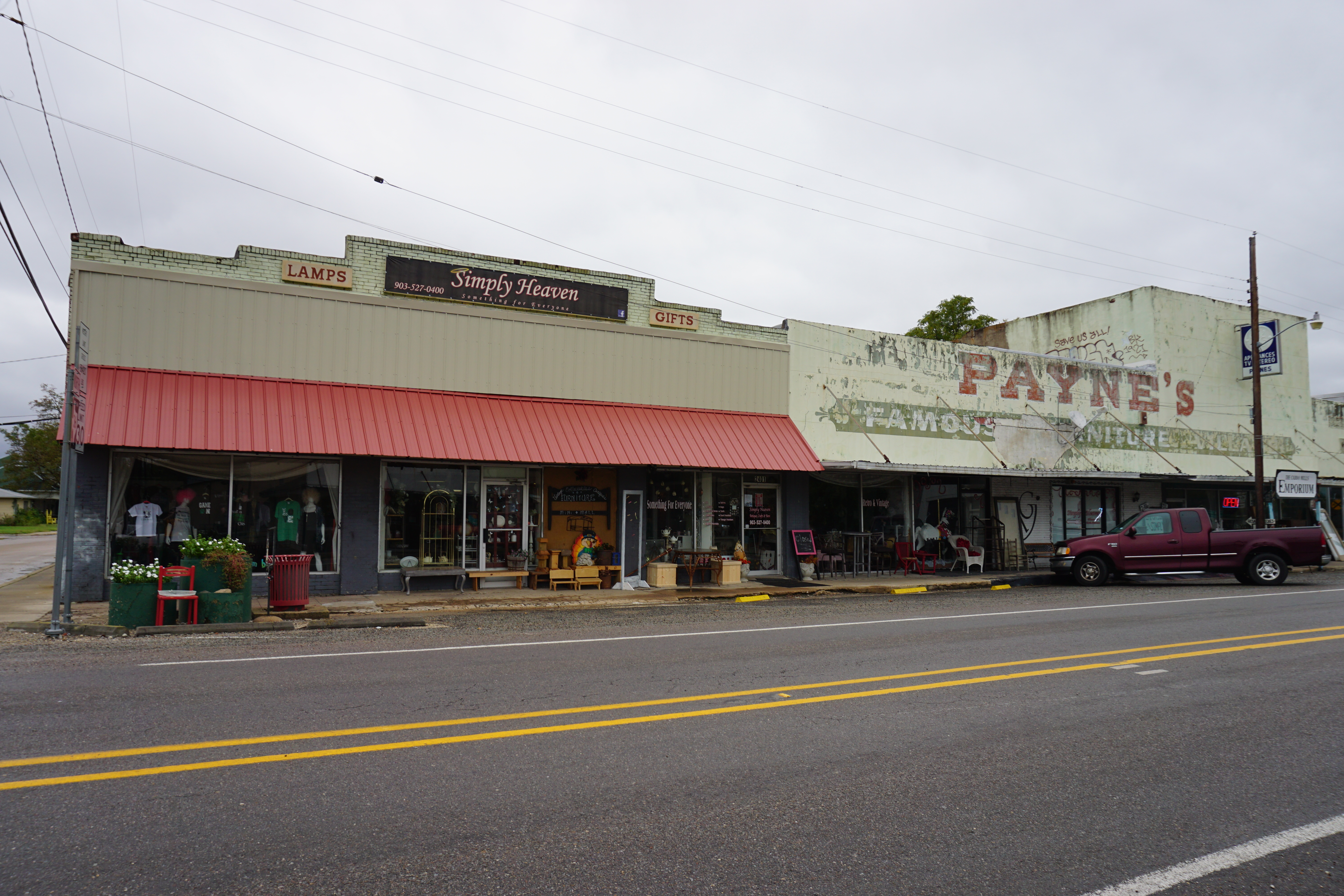
- Main Street in Caddo Mills
- Interactive map of Caddo Mills, Texas
- Coordinates: 33°02′25″N 96°14′20″W
- Country: United States
- State: Texas
- County: Hunt

Area
  - Total: 4.22 sq mi (10.94 km^{2})
  - Land: 4.22 sq mi (10.92 km^{2})
  - Water: 0.0077 sq mi (0.02 km^{2})
- Elevation: 495 ft (151 m)

Population (2020)
  - Total: 1,495
  - Estimate (2025): 5,715
  - Density: 354.6/sq mi (136.9/km^{2})
- Time zone: UTC-6 (Central (CST))
  - Summer (DST): UTC-5 (CDT)
- ZIP code: 75135
- Area codes: 903, 430
- FIPS code: 48-11716
- GNIS feature ID: 2409954
- Website: www.cityofcaddomills.com

Caddo Mills (/ˈkædoʊ/ KA-doh) is a rural city in Hunt County, Texas located at the western edge of Northeast Texas. Its population was 1,495 at the 2020 census, up from 1,338 at the 2010 census.

== History ==
Before settlers arrived, the area was the site of a Caddo campground. Pioneers arrived in the late 1850s. About 20 years later, I.T. Johnson and Henry King built a gristmill, and residents started referring to the community as Caddo Mills after the facility. On June 16, 1879, a post office opened. Around this time, the community had about 100 residents, three churches, and a school. In 1886, the Missouri, Kansas and Texas Railway built a line through the town, and the population increased to 500. In the 1890s and early 1900s, the town became home to a newspaper and a bank. The population swelled to 790, but began declining in the 1920s. Caddo Mills had 390 residents and 20 businesses when it was finally incorporated in the early 1940s.

== Geography ==
Caddo Mills is located in Northeast Texas at the western edge of Hunt County and the eastern edge of the Dallas/Fort Worth Metroplex. Texas State Highway 66 passes through the center of the city, leading northeast 9 miles (14 km) to Greenville, the county seat, and southwest the same distance to Royse City. Downtown Dallas is 41 miles (66 km) southwest of Caddo Mills with Sulphur Springs being 36 miles (58 km) northeast of Caddo Mills.

According to the United States Census Bureau, the city has a total area of 3.8 square miles (9.8 km^{2}), of which 0.01 sq mi (0.02 km^{2}), or 0.25%, is covered by water. West Caddo Creek, part of the Sabine River watershed, flows through the southwestern corner of the city.

== Demographics ==
Historical population
Census	Pop.	Note	%±
1940	390		—
1950	509		30.5%
1960	732		43.8%
1970	935		27.7%
1980	1,060		13.4%
1990	1,068		0.8%
2000	1,149		7.6%
2010	1,338		16.4%
2020	1,495		11.7%
2025 (est.)	5,715		282.3%
U.S. Decennial Census

=== 2020 census ===
As of the 2020 census, 1,495 people were residing in the city.

The median age was 35.7 years; 29.7% of residents were under 18 and 14.4% of residents were 65 or older. For every 100 females, there were 92.7 males, and for every 100 females 18 and over, there were 87.7 males. The census recorded 435 families in the city.

None of the residents lived in urban areas, while 100.0% lived in rural areas.

Of the 550 households in Caddo Mills, 44.2% had children under 18 living in them, 52.7% were married couples, 14.4% had a male householder and no spouse or partner present, and 27.6% had a female householder and no spouse or partner present. About 22.9% of all households were made up of individuals, and 11.5% had someone living alone who was 65 or older.

The 610 housing units were 9.8% were vacant. Among occupied housing units, 65.1% were owner-occupied and 34.9% were renter-occupied. The homeowner vacancy rate was 3.2% and the rental vacancy rate was 7.1%.

Caddo Mills racial composition as of 2020 (NH = Non-Hispanic) (Note: Note: the US Census treats Hispanic/Latino as an ethnic category. This table excludes Latinos from the racial categories and assigns them to a separate category. Hispanics/Latinos can be of any race.)
Race	Number	Percentage
White (NH)	1,197	80.07%
Black or African American (NH)	47	3.14%
Native American or Alaska Native (NH)	7	0.47%
Asian (NH)	2	0.13%
Some other race (NH)	4	0.27%
Multiracial (NH)	50	3.34%
Hispanic or Latino	188	12.58%
Total	1,495	

Racial composition as of the 2020 census
Race	Percent
White	84.7%
Black or African American	3.5%
American Indian and Alaska Native	0.9%
Asian	0.2%
Native Hawaiian and Other Pacific Islander	0%
Some other race	2.3%
Two or more races	8.4%
Hispanic or Latino (of any race)	12.6%

== Education ==
The city is served by the Caddo Mills Independent School District.

== Transportation ==
=== Major highways ===
- Interstate 30
- U.S. Highway 67 (runs concurrently with Interstate 30)
- State Highway 66

=== Minor highways ===
- Farm to Market Road 6
- Farm to Market Road 36
- Farm to Market Road 1565

=== Air ===
The city of Caddo Mills owns the Caddo Mills Municipal Airport, which provides general aviation services to the area.

=== Rail ===
The city is served by the Dallas, Garland and Northeastern Railroad, which operates the former Missouri, Kansas and Texas line. It is used for freight only.

== Notable person ==
- Guy Benton Johnson, sociologist
