= List of ultralight helicopters =

Ultralight helicopters are classified as ultralight aircraft by the FAA and as Very Light Rotorcraft (VLR) by the EASA.

Type	Country	Notes
CG 600	China	
Tongqi Coax Copter	China	Single seat coaxial heli
Rudimentary Coax Copter	China	Single seat coaxial heli
Circus Performer's	China	Single seat coaxial heli
Yellow CoAx Heli	China	Single seat coaxial heli
Ultrasport 254	United States	First ultralight
Curti Zefhir	Italy	
DF Helicopters DF334	Italy	
SKT Helicopters/ DKT07	Swiss / Italy / Belgium	
Micron Coax Helicopter	Russia	
SCH 1A Miro CRV	Slovenia	
RT 216	China / Germany	
Evocopter	Germany	
RotorSchmiede VA115	Germany	Coaxial Single Seater
RotorSchmiede VA250	Germany	Coaxial Double Seater
EDM Aerotec CoAX 2D/2R	Germany	
Youngcopter Neo	Germany	NOTAR
Heli-Sport CH-7	Argentina / Italy	HeliLight ULM
JH-2	China	Dynali H3 & AK1-3 parts
Gray Zhu bi-place heli	China	2 seat bi-place copter
Lightest coaxial heli	China	Single seat coaxial heli
Coaxial black heli	China	Coaxial Single Seater
Shandong coax heli	China	Coaxial Single Seater
Guo Leiting's Coax	China	Yuncheng Farmer's Chopper
Shantou Copters	China	Homebuilt Helis by Farmer
Chen Ruihua Jiangsu	China	Coaxial Single Seater
Coaxial heli Zhuzhou	China	Coaxial Single Seater
Agricultural coaxial heli	China	
Red Coaxial Helicopter	China	Coaxial Single Seater
White Coaxial Chopper	China	Coaxial Single Seater
Homebuilt Coaxial Heli	China	Coaxial Single Seater
Yellow tail coaxial heli	China	
Famà Kiss 209	Italy	
Sk-1 Twinpower	Italy	
G-250 Eagle	Italy	Engine Turbine
LCA LH 212 Delta	Italy	
YoYo Helicopter	Italy	
Egicopter	Italy	
Client of Vibratech	France	Prototype
Aquinea Volta	France	Electric ULM
Le Minimax	France	LH160E
Mustang F290	France / Spain	
Helismart	France	
HTC 130	France	Heli-Tech Helicopters
Orlan	Russia	
Aerokopter AK1-3 Sanka	Ukraine	
Skyline SL-231 Scout	Ukraine	
ZH281	Ukraine	
Vibston Aero	Ukraine	
Voytovich helicopter	Ukraine	
Kazachok Helicopter	Russia	
Kazan Aktai	Russia	
Rotorfly	Russia	
Berkut (helicopter)	Russia	
FLY CC III	Czech Republic	
JB3 Dragon Fly	Canada	2 seater like R22
jpkrucker	Canada	Single seat coaxial heli
Mosquito XE	Canada / United States	
Hungarocopter HC-01	Hungary	
Hungarocopter HC-02	Hungary	
CoaX helicopters	Australia	
Diora Helicopters	Hungary	
NADC Bongo	Czech Republic	NOTAR
AirScooter	United States	
Scion SA-400 Jackal	United States	
Helicycle	United States	
Sorhge HX	Argentina	
Ezycopter	Taiwan	
Helirotex Lince One	Italy	
Konner K1	Italy	
Syton AH130	Italy	
Bug Helicopters	United Kingdom	
Heliwhale Afalina	Russia	
Dynali H3 EasyFlyer	Belgium	
Volocopter 2X	Germany	
Safari Helicopter	Canada / United States	
Millennium MH-1	United States	
Revolution Mini-500	United States	
CHI KC 518 Adventourer	New Zealand	

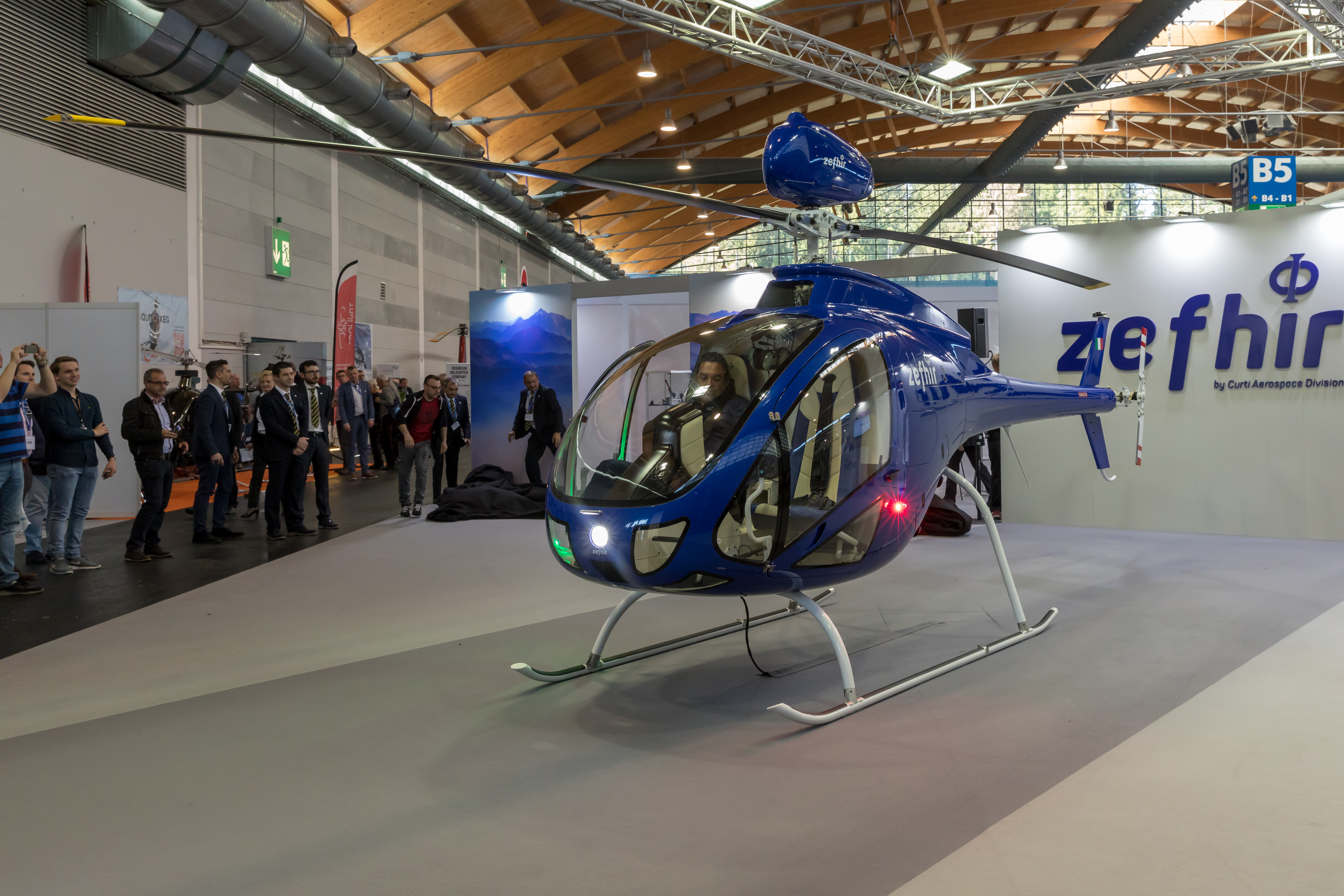
Curti Zefhir

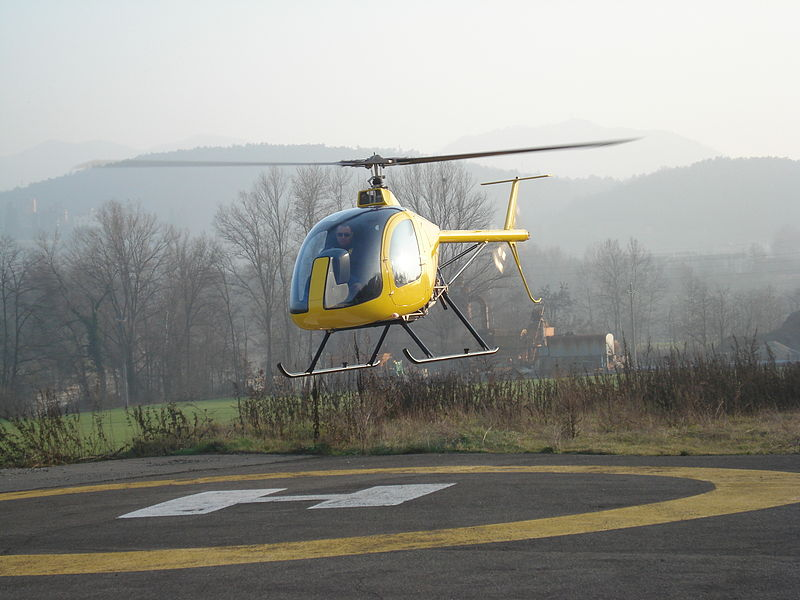
DF 334

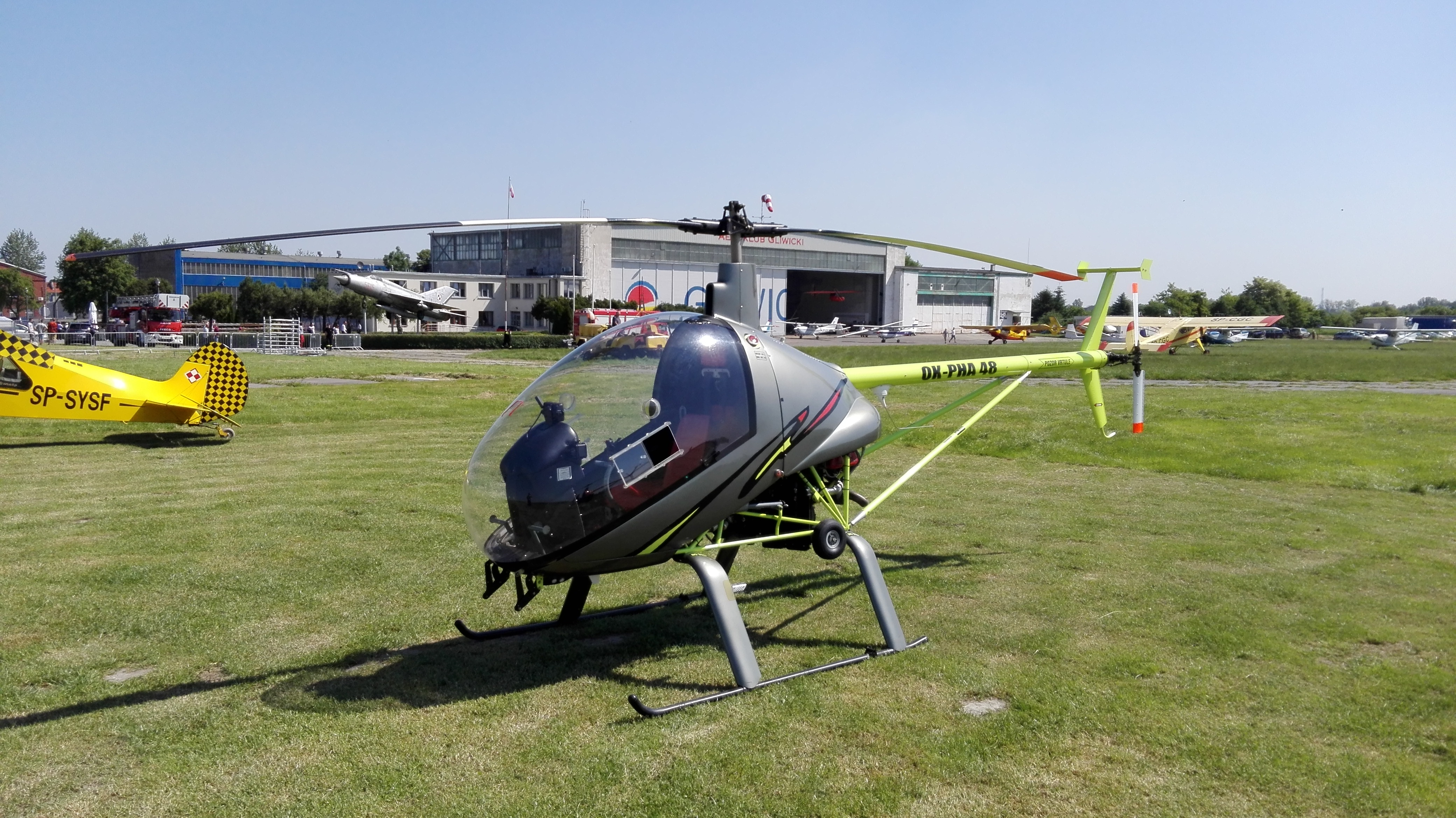
Heli-Sport CH-7

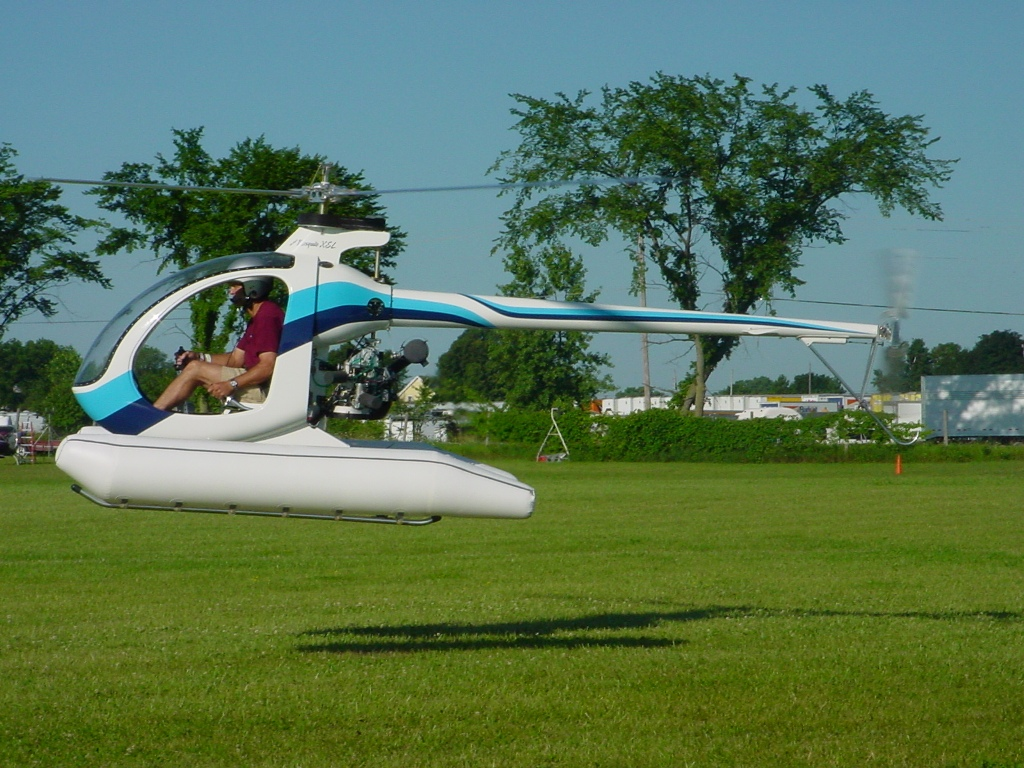
Mosquito XE

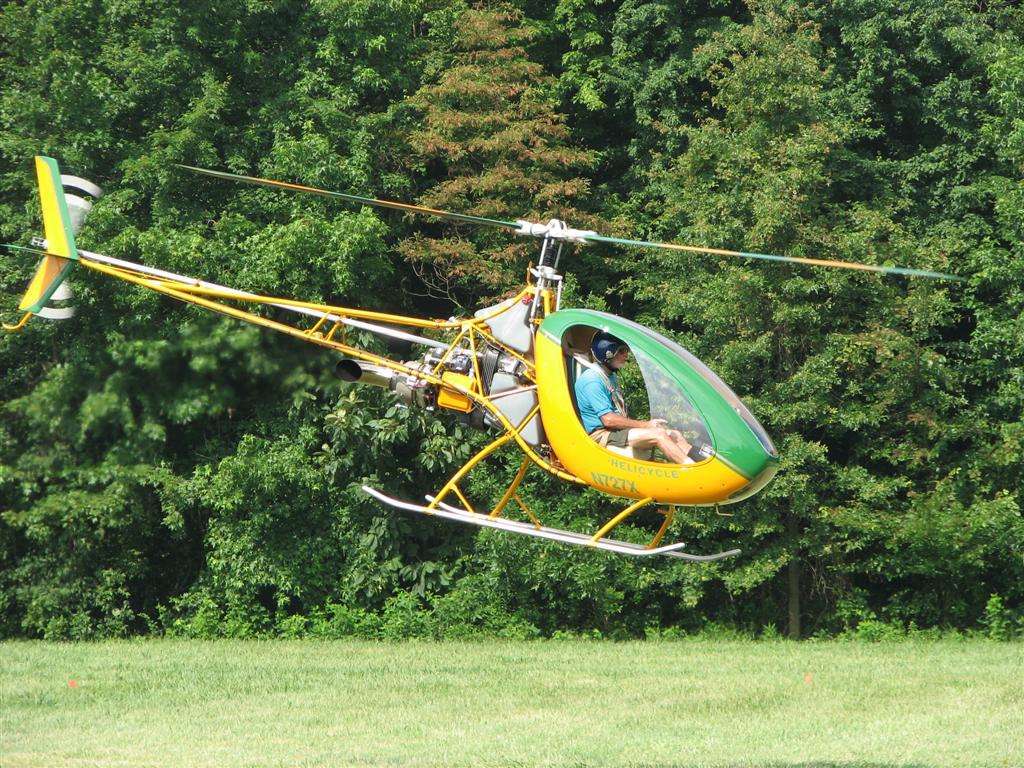
Eagle Helicycle

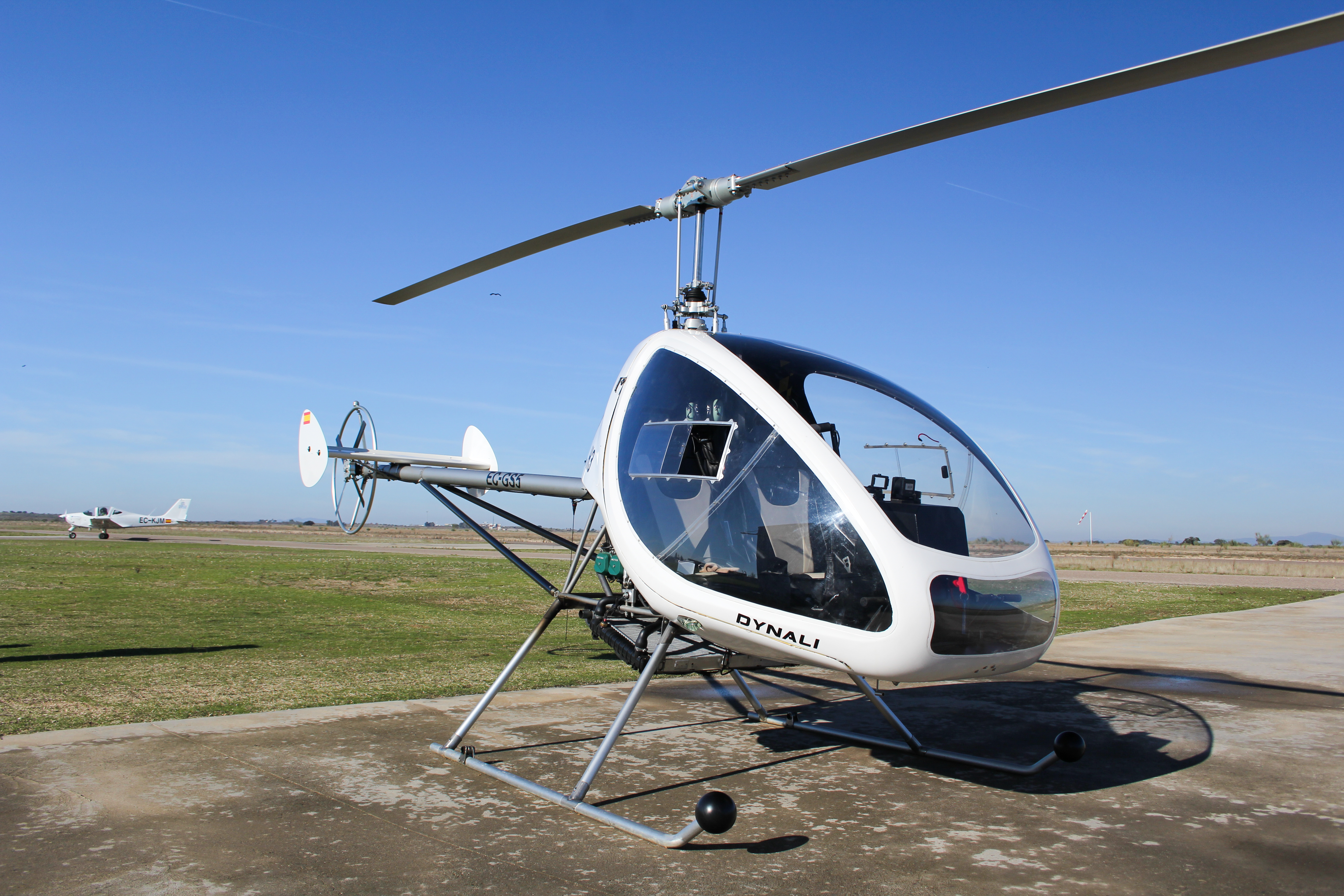
Dynali H3

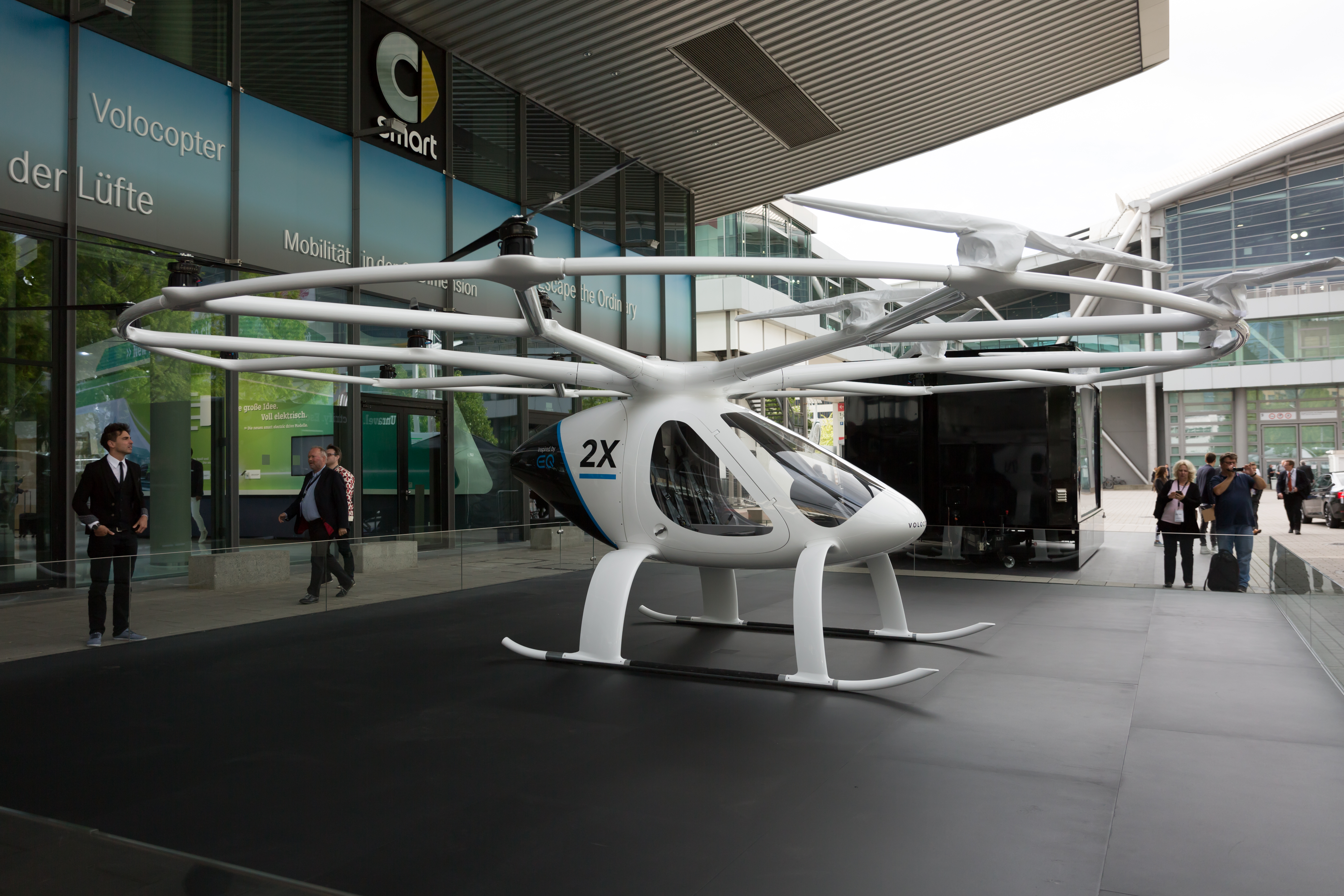
Volocopter 2X

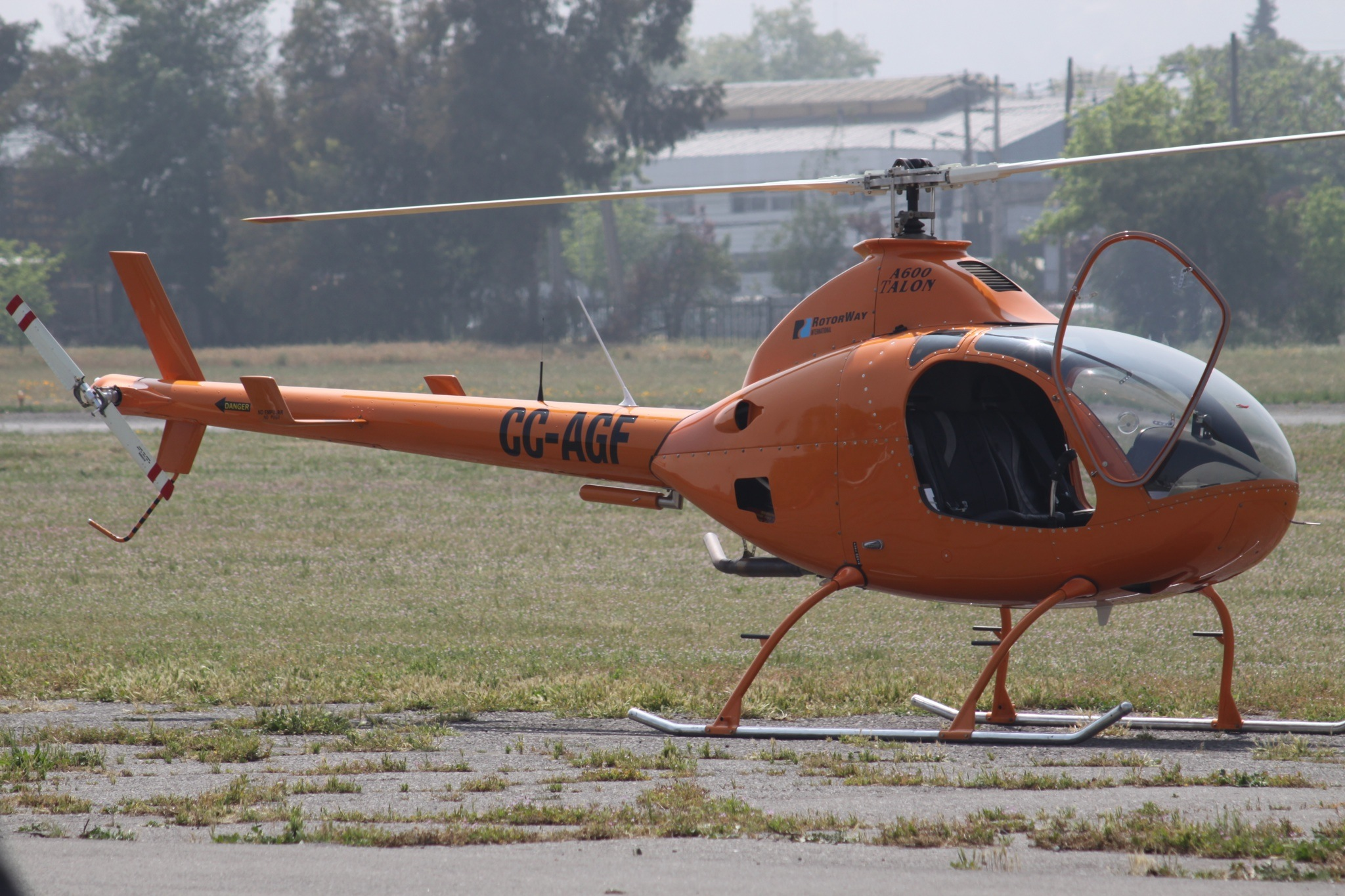
RotorWay Exec

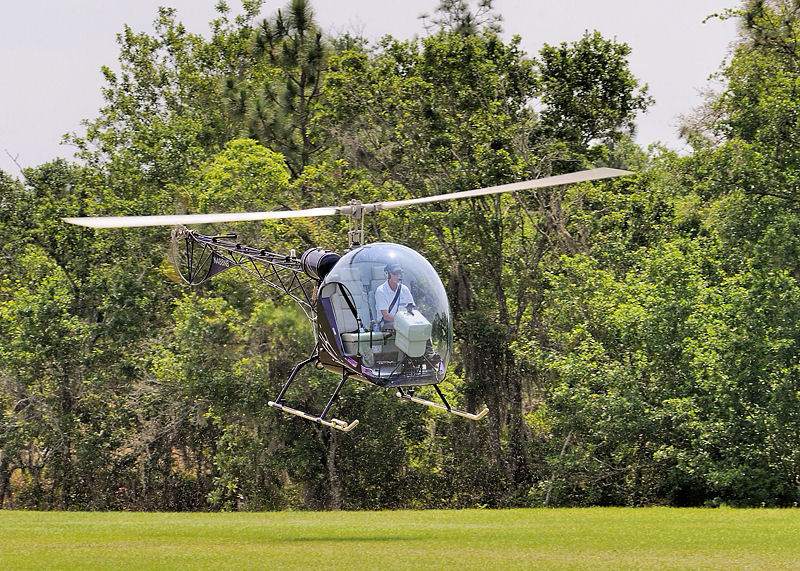
Safari Helicopter

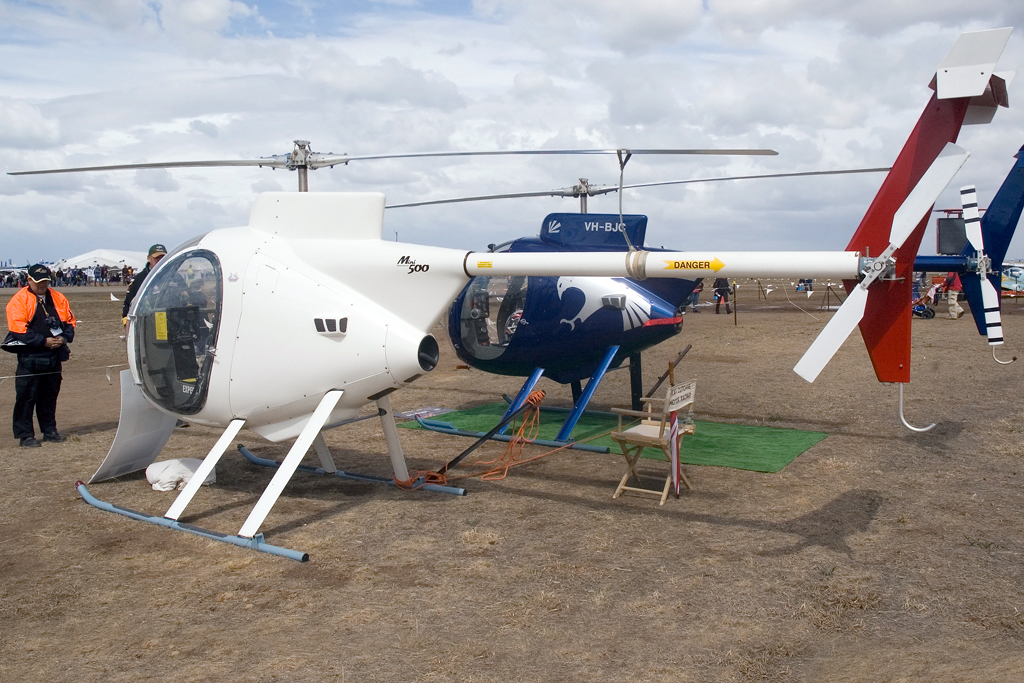
Revolution Mini-500

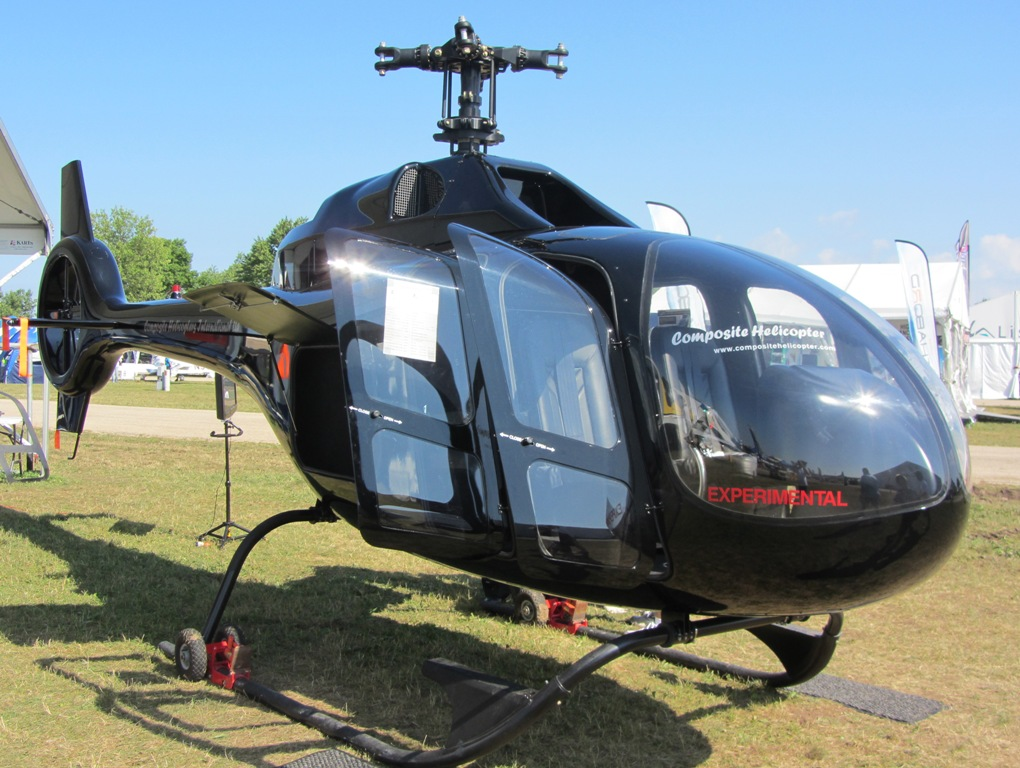
CHI KC 518 Adventourer

== See also ==
- Personal Aerial Vehicles
- List of Personal Aerial Vehicles
