= Famà Kiss 209 =

Kiss 209M

General information
- Type: Ultralight helicopter
- National origin: Italy
- Manufacturer: Famà Helicopters srl, Solignano
- Designer: Nino Famà

History
- First flight: 13 August 2009

The Famà Kiss 209M is an Italian ultralight two-seat helicopter, built from composite materials around a steel frame and with an optional retractable undercarriage. The moniker "Kiss" stands for "keep it stupidly simple", reflecting the philosophy of its designer, Nino Famà.

== Design and development ==
The Kiss 209M is a single rotor, conventionally laid out helicopter seating two side-by-side. The design targets were low cost and easy maintenance, combined with a comfortable cabin and good performance. The centre section and the high-set tail boom are tube steel structures, clad in carbon fibre. The cabin shell is also carbon fibre and bolts to the central frame. The 120 kW (160 hp) Solar T62 turboshaft engine is supported above the cabin roof and tail line, partly exposed, driving twin blade main and tail rotors. The latter is accompanied at the extreme tail by a fin/underfin pair, both swept and slender. A narrow pair of tailplanes is located forward of the tail rotor on the boom, though the prototype initially flew with a T-tail. The Kiss can have either a skid or retractable wheel undercarriage.

The main rotor advances to the right and the anti-torque tail rotor, mounted on the left side of the tail boom, advances at the bottom. The semi-articulated main rotor is supported on an underslung teetering hinge. Pitch inputs to the main rotor blades are transmitted via rods inside the hollow main rotor shaft.

Control of the Kiss is conventional and manual. Dual control is an option. It is fitted with an electronic flight instrument system (EFIS).

After ground runs on 15 July 2009, the Kiss flew for the first time on 13 August. The first production aircraft completed company testing at the end of January 2011 and went to the Aéro-Club de France for a six-month evaluation.

== Variants ==
209M
Retractable three-wheel undercarriage. The nosewheel retracts rearwards, the other inwards.
209MF
Twin fixed skid undercarriage: 20 kg (44 lb) lighter, maximum cruising speed reduced by 16 km/h (10 mph).

== Specifications (209M) ==
Data from Jane's All the World's Aircraft 2011/12

General characteristics

- Capacity: 2
- Length: 8.22 m (27 ft 0 in) overall, rotors turning
- Width: 1.25 m (4 ft 1 in) cockpit, inside
- Height: 2.50 m (8 ft 2 in) overall
- Empty weight: 308 kg (679 lb)
- Fuel capacity: 150 L (40 US gal, 33 Imp gal)
- Powerplant: 1 × Solar T62 Titan turboshaft, 120 kW (160 hp)
- Main rotor diameter: 7.70 m (25 ft 3 in)
- Main rotor area: 46.57 m^{2} (501.3 sq ft)
- Propellers: 2-bladed tail rotor, 1.265 m (4 ft 2 in) diameter

Performance

- Maximum speed: 194 km/h (121 mph, 105 kn)
- Cruise speed: 185 km/h (115 mph, 100 kn) maximum
- Endurance: 3 h standard; optional extra tank gives 4 h
- Service ceiling: 3,100 m (10,200 ft) outside ground effect; 3,800 m (12,500 ft) within ground effect
- Rate of climb: 11 m/s (2,200 ft/min) at sea level

Avionics
EFIS

== See also ==
Aircraft of comparable role, configuration, and era

- Aerokopter AK1-3 Sanka
- Alpi Syton AH 130
- DF Helicopters DF334
- Dynali H2S
- LCA LH 212 Delta
- RotorWay Exec

Related lists

- List of rotorcraft
- List of ultralight helicopters
