= VA250 =

VA250 may refer to:

- Ariane flight VA250, an Ariane 5 launch that occurred on 26 November 2019
- Virginia State Route 250 (disambiguation) (US 250 or VA-250), a highway in the United States
- RotorSchmiede VA250, an ultralight helicopter
