= LCA LH 212 Delta =

LH 212 Delta

General information
- Type: Helicopter
- National origin: Italy
- Manufacturer: LCA Srl
- Number built: 11 by September 2012

History
- First flight: by 2010

The LCA LH 212 Delta is a two-seat Italian piston engine ultralight helicopter first flown in 2010.

== Design and development ==
Though strong similarities between the Delta and another Italian helicopter, the 1989 DF Helicopters DF334, have been noted, it is not clear if there are direct relationships between either the machines or their makers. The Delta made its first flight after eight years of development.

The Delta has a standard pod and boom layout, the latter high set, slender and braced with a narrow angle V-form strut pair to its halfway point from bottom of the pod. It has a short span tailplane with small endplate fins raised above the boom on a swept, high aspect ratio fin, forming a T-tail. The tail rotor, mounted on the starboard side of the boom, has its two blades protected from ground strikes by a long, curved tubular bumper.

The pod seats two side-by-side behind a full clear forward transparency. Its skin is carbon fibre over a titanium alloy tube frame. Tandem controls are fitted, with two sets of anti-torque pedals and a T-shaped cyclic control centrally mounted on a console; the single collective pitch lever is placed between the seats. A governor sets the throttle in the absence of pilot input and trim is applied electrically. Small baggage can be stored in under seat lockers. Cabin access is through forward hinged doors in each side. A 84.5 kW (113 hp) Rotax 914 turbocharged, liquid cooled, flat four piston engine with narrow rectangular cheek radiators is mounted behind the seats and partly exposed at the rear, driving a two blade main rotor. The helicopter lands on skids, transversely braced by a pair of airfoil section struts and positioned below the pod on two pairs of similar outward leaning struts, producing a skid track of 1.585 m (5 ft 2 in).

== Operational history ==
The first flight was in 2010 and marketing began in September 2011 at the Blois international ultra light show. A year later eleven flyaway examples had been built. A kit build version is planned.

== Specifications ==
Data from Jane's All the World's Aircraft 2013–14

General characteristics

- Capacity: Two
- Length: 6.185 m (20 ft 4 in) tail rotor turning
- Height: 2.34 m (7 ft 8 in) to fin tip
- Empty weight: 280 kg (617 lb)
- Gross weight: 450 kg (992 lb)
- Fuel capacity: 47 kg (104 lb)
- Powerplant: 1 × Rotax 914 turbocharged liquid cooled flat four, 84.5 kW (113.3 hp)
- Main rotor diameter: 6.68 m (21 ft 11 in)
- Main rotor area: 35.05 m^{2} (377.3 sq ft) twin blade

Performance

- Cruise speed: 160 km/h (99 mph, 86 kn)
- Never exceed speed: 200 km/h (120 mph, 110 kn)
- Range: 450 km (280 mi, 240 nmi)
- Endurance: 3 hr
- Service ceiling: 5,000 m (16,000 ft) service; hover in ground effect, 3,500 m (11,483 ft); hover out of ground effect 2,500 m (8,202 ft)
- Rate of climb: 7.5 m/s (1,480 ft/min) maximum, at sea level

== See also ==
Aircraft of comparable role, configuration, and era

- Aerokopter AK1-3 Sanka
- Alpi Syton AH 130
- DF Helicopters DF334
- Dynali H2S
- Famà Kiss 209
- RotorWay Exec

Related lists

- List of rotorcraft
- List of ultralight helicopters
