= Dragonfly (disambiguation) =

A dragonfly is a flying insect of the order Odonata.

Dragonfly or DragonFly may also refer to:

== Aircraft ==
- Boeing X-50 Dragonfly, an unmanned aerial surveillance vehicle designed by the U.S. military
- Cessna A-37 Dragonfly, a US attack aircraft
- Castiglioni Dragon Fly 333 (Dragon Fly 333), an Italian helicopter
- DF Helicopters DF334 (Dragon Fly 334), an Italian helicopter
- De Havilland Dragonfly, a British aircraft
- Dornier Do 12 Libelle III (Dragonfly III), a German flying boat
- Dragonfly (G.I. Joe), a fictional make of helicopter in the G.I. Joe: A Real American Hero toyline
- Flylight Dragonfly, a British ultralight trike design
- FlyTech Dragonfly, a remote-controlled flying toy ornithopter
- Glasflügel Libelle, a glider, German for dragonfly
- Moyes Dragonfly, an Australian ultralight aircraft
- Prestwick Dragonfly MPA Mk 1, a 1970s United Kingdom human-powered aircraft
- Sikorsky H-5, a US helicopter sometimes called Dragonfly
  - Westland Dragonfly, the UK version of the Sikorsky H-5
- Viking Dragonfly, an experimental equal-area canard airplane

== Spacecraft ==
- Dragon 2 DragonFly, a prototype reusable spacecraft by SpaceX
- Dragonfly (Titan space probe), a planned NASA rotorcraft and lander for a mission to Titan
- Project Dragonfly (space study), a conceptual design study for a laser-propelled interstellar probe

== Computing ==
- DragonFly BSD, an operating system
- Opera Dragonfly, a web developer tool integrated in the Opera browser
- Dragonfly (search engine), a prototype
- Dragonfly+, an InfiniBand network topology; for example see National Computational Infrastructure

== Film and television ==
- Dragonfly (1976 film) or One Summer Love, a romantic drama starring Beau Bridges and Susan Sarandon
- The Man from Hong Kong (US title The Dragon Flies), a 1975 action film
- Dragonfly (2001 film), by Marius Holst
- Dragonfly (2002 film), directed by Tom Shadyac
- Dragonflies (film), a 2022 Spanish drama film
- Dragonfly (2025 film), a British drama by Paul Andrew Williams

== Literature ==
- Dragonfly (Durbin novel), a 1999 novel by Frederic S. Durbin
- Dragonfly (Koontz novel), a 1975 novel by Dean Koontz
- Dragonfly: NASA and the Crisis Aboard Mir, a book by Bryan Burrough
- "Dragonfly", a short story in Tales from Earthsea by Ursula K. Le Guin

== Fictional characters ==
- Dragonfly (AC Comics), a superheroine
- Dragonfly (Marvel Comics), a supervillainess
- Dragonfly, main protagonist from Superhero Movie

== Music ==
=== Performers ===
- Dragonfly (band), a Croatian band
- Dragonfly, a singer featured on Bob Sinclar's 2012 song "Rock the Boat"

=== Albums ===
- Dragon Fly (album), by Jefferson Starship, 1974
- Dragonfly (Ego Likeness album), 2000
- Dragonfly (Jimmy Giuffre album) or the title song, 1983
- Dragonfly (Kasey Chambers album) or the title song, 2017
- Dragonfly (Masami Okui album) or the title song, 2005
- Dragonfly (Strawbs album) or the title song, 1970
- Dragonfly (Ziggy Marley album) or the title song, 2003
- Dragonfly, by the Choir, 2026
- Dragonfly, an EP by Paul Weller, 2012

=== Songs ===
- "Dragonfly" (Fleetwood Mac song), 1971
- "Dragonfly", by a-ha from Lifelines, 2002
- "Dragonfly", by Blondie from The Hunter, 1982
- "Dragonfly", by Caligula's Horse from Bloom, 2015
- "Dragonfly", by Edguy from Tinnitus Sanctus, 2008
- "Dragonfly", by Hitomi Shimatani, 2007
- "Dragonfly", by Mahogany Rush from Mahogany Rush IV, 1976
- "Dragonfly", by the Nolans from Altogether, 1982
- "Dragonfly", by Pentangle from Open the Door, 1985
- "Dragonfly", by Shaman's Harvest from Shine, 2009
- "Dragonfly", by SMiLE.dk, 2001
- "Dragonfly", by Trey Anastasio from Bar 17, 2006
- "Dragonfly", by Yngwie Malmsteen from Fire and Ice, 1992
- "The Dragonfly", by Clutch from The Elephant Riders, 1998
- "Dragonflies", by Red House Painters from Red House Painters (Rollercoaster), 1993

== Other uses ==
- Dragonfly (chess variant), a chess variant invented by Christian Freeling
- Dragonfly (company), a South Korean video game developer
- Dragonfly Creek, a stream in the Presidio of San Francisco, California, U.S.
- Dragonfly Telephoto Array, a telescope array that uses a combination of telephoto lenses
- Dragonfly Trimarans, a line of trimarans built in Denmark
- Pilotwings (video game), a 1990 Super Nintendo Entertainment System game, known as Dragonfly during development
- SS Dragonfly (1883–1889), a British cargo steamship
- Dragonfly, a 2024 motor superyacht
- The Dragonfly, a short ballet by Anna Pavlova
- DragonFLY, a serotonin receptor agonist and possible psychedelic drug
- Hiroshima Dragonflies, a Japanese professional basketball team

== See also ==
- Bromo-DragonFLY, a psychoactive drug
- Dragon Flyz, an American animated TV series
- DragonflyTV, an American educational children's series
