= RotorWay A600 Talon =

American helicopter

A600 Talon turbo
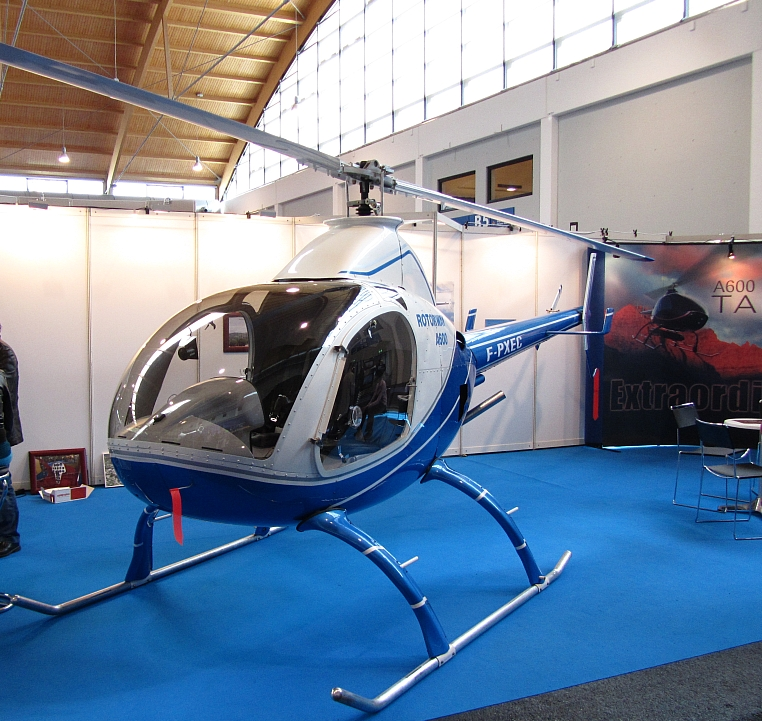

General information
- Type: Helicopter
- National origin: United States
- Manufacturer: RotorWay International
- Status: In production (2019)

History
- Developed from: RotorWay Exec

The RotorWay A600 Talon turbo is an American helicopter, designed and produced by RotorWay International of Chandler, Arizona. The aircraft is supplied as a kit for amateur construction.

By April 2017 the company seemed to have dropped the name Talon, referring to the aircraft just as the A600.

== Design and development ==
The A600 Talon is a development of the RotorWay Exec and externally resembles the earlier design. The A600 incorporates a different structure, a shaft-driven tail rotor, taller and longer landing skids and a new in-house developed turbocharged powerplant.

The A600 features a single main rotor, a two-seats in side-by-side configuration enclosed cockpit with a windshield, skid-type landing gear and a turbocharged four-stroke, 147 hp (110 kW) RotorWay RI 600S engine that drives the 25 ft (7.6 m) diameter two-bladed rotor and conventional 50.25 in (127.6 cm) diameter two-bladed tail rotor. The aircraft has an empty weight of 965 lb (438 kg) and a gross weight of 1,500 lb (680 kg), giving a useful load of 535 lb (243 kg). With full fuel of 17 U.S. gallons (64 L; 14 imp gal) the payload is 433 lb (196 kg).

The aircraft is capable of an in ground effect hover at 6,000 ft (1,829 m) and an out of ground effect hover at 4,000 ft (1,219 m)

== Operational history ==
By February 2013 seven examples had been registered in the United States with the Federal Aviation Administration, one with the Civil Aviation Authority in the United Kingdom and one with Transport Canada.

== Specifications ==
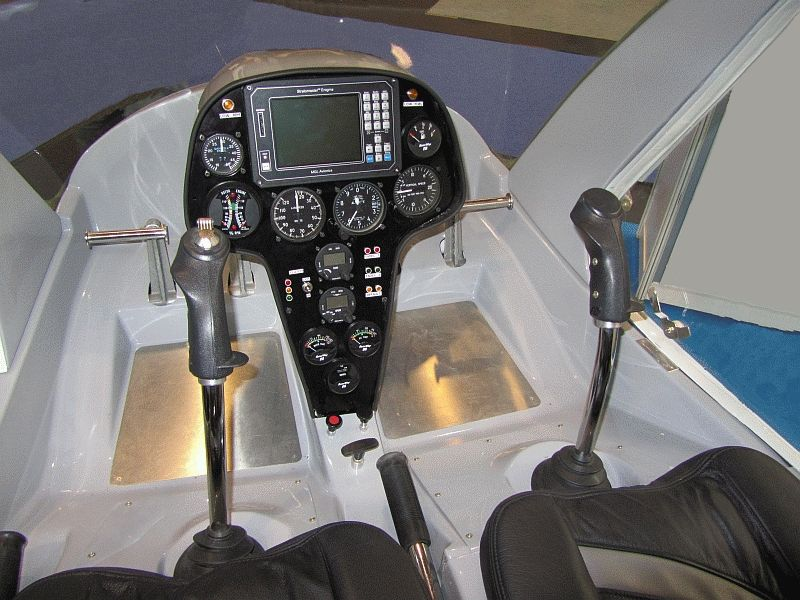
Rotorway A600 Talon cockpit

Data from Bayerl and RotorWay

General characteristics

- Crew: one
- Capacity: one passenger
- Length: 29 ft 6 in (8.99 m) overall, with main rotor fore and aft
- Height: 8 ft 7 in (2.62 m)
- Empty weight: 965 lb (438 kg)
- Gross weight: 1,500 lb (680 kg)
- Fuel capacity: 17 U.S. gallons (64 L; 14 imp gal)
- Powerplant: 1 × RotorWay RI 600S four stroke aircraft engine, 147 hp (110 kW)
- Main rotor diameter: 25 ft (7.6 m)

Performance

- Maximum speed: 115 mph (185 km/h, 100 kn)
- Cruise speed: 100 mph (160 km/h, 87 kn)
- Endurance: 2.0 hours
- Service ceiling: 10,000 ft (3,000 m)
- Rate of climb: 1,000 ft/min (5.1 m/s)

== See also ==
- DF Helicopters DF334
- Dynali H2S
- Heli-Sport CH-7
