= Dynali H2S =

Belgian kit helicopter

H2S
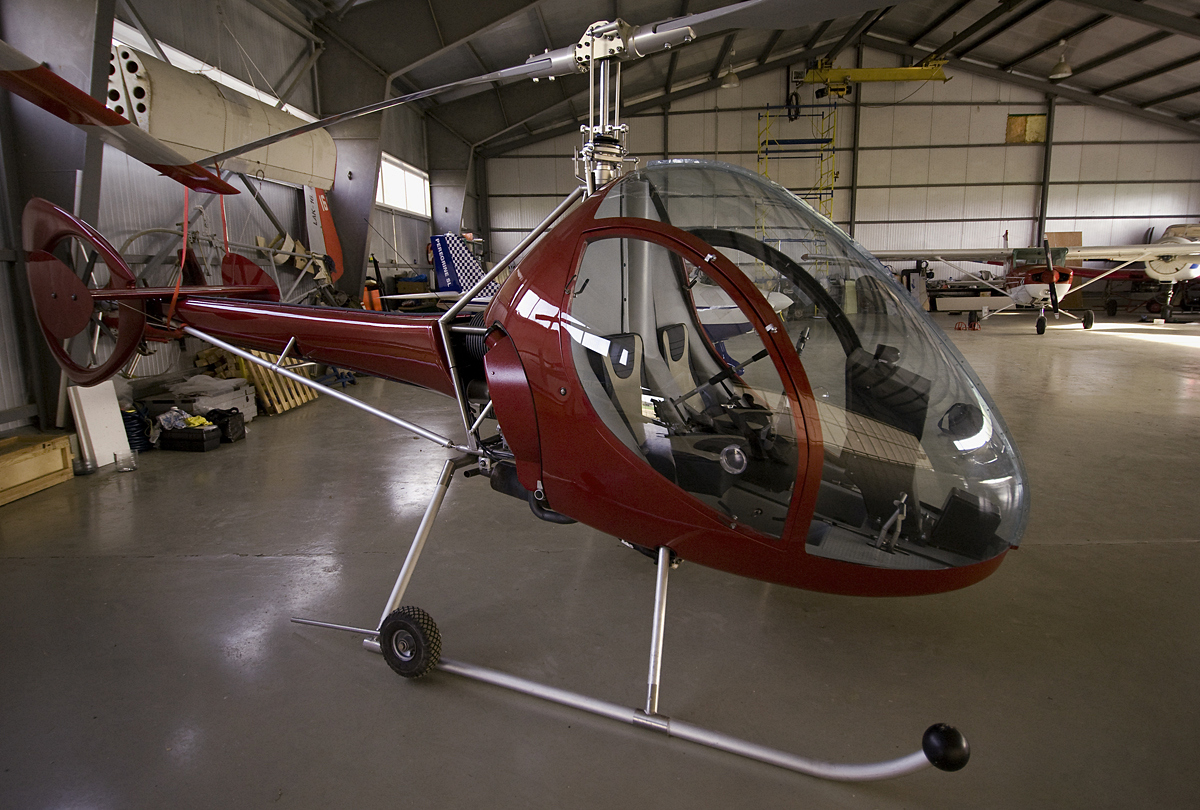

General information
- Type: Helicopter
- National origin: Belgium
- Manufacturer: Dynali Helicopter Company
- Designer: Jacky Tonet
- Status: Production completed (2017)

The Dynali H2S is a Belgian helicopter, designed by Jacky Tonet and produced by Dynali of the Thines district of Nivelles. When it was available the aircraft was supplied as a kit for amateur construction or fully assembled, supplied ready-to-fly.

By December 2017 the design was no longer advertised on the company website and production has most likely ended.

== Design and development ==
The H2S was designed to comply with the amateur-built aircraft rules, but a light-sport aircraft category version, the Dynali H3, is also being developed. It features a single main rotor, a two-seats-in side-by-side configuration enclosed cockpit with a windshield, skid-type landing gear and a four-cylinder, liquid cooled four-stroke, 165 to 185 hp (123 to 138 kW) Subaru EJ25 automotive conversion engine.

The aircraft fuselage is made from a combination of aluminium tubing and welded stainless steel, covered with a polycarbonate fairing. Its 7.22 m (23.7 ft) diameter two-bladed rotor has a chord of 20 cm (7.9 in) and employs composite main rotor blades. The tail rotor is of an enclosed Fenestron type with eight blades. The aircraft has an empty weight of 465 kg (1,025 lb) and a gross weight of 700 kg (1,543 lb), giving a useful load of 235 kg (518 lb). With full fuel of 80 litres (18 imp gal; 21 US gal) the payload is 177 kg (390 lb).

Like many helicopters designed in France and Russia, the main rotor blades advance to the left.

== Variants ==
Kit version
Model with a gross weight of 700 kg (1,543 lb), powered by a four cylinder, air-cooled, four-stroke, 165 to 185 hp (123 to 138 kW) Subaru EJ25 automotive conversion engine.
Dynali H3 EasyFlyer
Lightened version powered by a four cylinder, air and liquid-cooled, four-stroke, dual ignition 100 hp (75 kW) Rotax 912S or a turbocharged 115 hp (86 kW) Rotax 914 engine for the light-sport aircraft category.

== Specifications (H2S) ==
Data from Bayerl and Dynali

General characteristics

- Crew: one
- Capacity: one passenger
- Length: 7.95 m (26 ft 1 in) blades fore and aft
- Width: 2.00 m (6 ft 7 in) at the landing gear
- Empty weight: 465 kg (1,025 lb)
- Gross weight: 700 kg (1,543 lb)
- Fuel capacity: 80 litres (18 imp gal; 21 US gal)
- Powerplant: 1 × Subaru EJ25 four cylinder, air-cooled, four-stroke automotive engine, 138 kW (185 hp)
- Main rotor diameter: 7.22 m (23 ft 8 in)

Performance

- Maximum speed: 190 km/h (120 mph, 100 kn)
- Cruise speed: 150 km/h (93 mph, 81 kn)
- Rate of climb: 6 m/s (1,200 ft/min)

== See also ==
Aircraft of comparable role, configuration, and era

- Aerokopter AK1-3 Sanka
- Alpi Syton AH 130
- DF Helicopters DF334
- Famà Kiss 209
- Heli-Sport CH-7
- LCA LH 212 Delta
- RotorWay Exec

Related lists

- List of rotorcraft
- List of ultralight helicopters
