= Aerokopter AK1-3 Sanka =

1999 Ukrainian helicopter

AK1-3
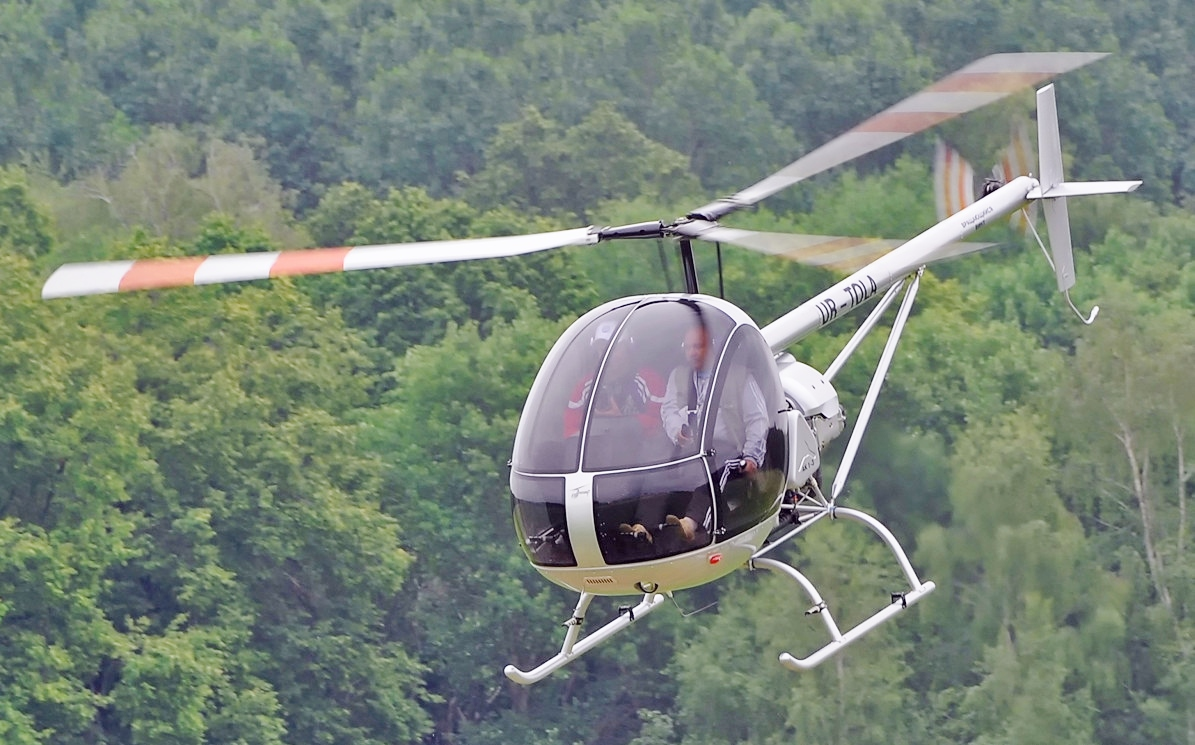

General information
- Type: Helicopter
- National origin: Ukraine
- Manufacturer: Aerokopter
- Status: In production (2014)
- Number built: 102 (December 2020)

History
- First flight: 1999

The Aerokopter AK1-3 is a Ukrainian helicopter, designed and produced by Aerokopter (also spelled "Aerocopter") of Kharkiv. The aircraft is supplied as complete ready-to-fly-aircraft.

Some sources refer to the AK1-3 as the Sanka or San'ka while others do not.

== Design and development ==
The AK1-3 was designed to comply with the Ukrainian AP-27 rules, which are similar to the European Aviation Safety Agency CS-27 standard. The aircraft features a single main rotor with a tail rotor, a two-seats-in side-by-side configuration enclosed cockpit, skid-type landing gear and a four-cylinder, air-cooled, four-stroke, 156 hp (116 kW) Subaru EJ25 automotive engine.

The aircraft's 6.84 m (22.4 ft) diameter three-bladed Starflex rotor has a chord of 15 cm (5.9 in) and employs a unique torsion bar blade mounting that allows blade movement to produce pitch angle changes, flapping, as well as lead and lag. The main transmission consists of belt drives, with the tail rotor driven by a solid shaft. The aircraft has an empty weight of 380 kg (838 lb) and a gross weight of 650 kg (1,433 lb), giving a useful load of 270 kg (595 lb). With full fuel of 75 litres (16 imp gal; 20 US gal) the payload is 216 kg (476 lb).

The design received a Ukrainian type certificate in 2006.

In 2009 Aerokopter (DB Aercopters) was acquired by the Perla Group of companies Perla Aviation division, with the stated intention of moving the assembly line of the AK1-3 to the United Arab Emirates (UAE).

By December 2020 the company reported 102 helicopters had been delivered.

== Operational history ==
By December 2020 one 2008 model AK1-3, serial number 1001, had been registered in the United States with the Federal Aviation Administration in the Special Certificate of Airworthiness Experimental-Exhibition category. It was registered in January 2018. The same aircraft, serial number 1001, had been previously registered with Transport Canada in the Special Certificate of Airworthiness - Limited Category from 2009 to 2015, prior to being exported to the US in 2015.

== Variants ==
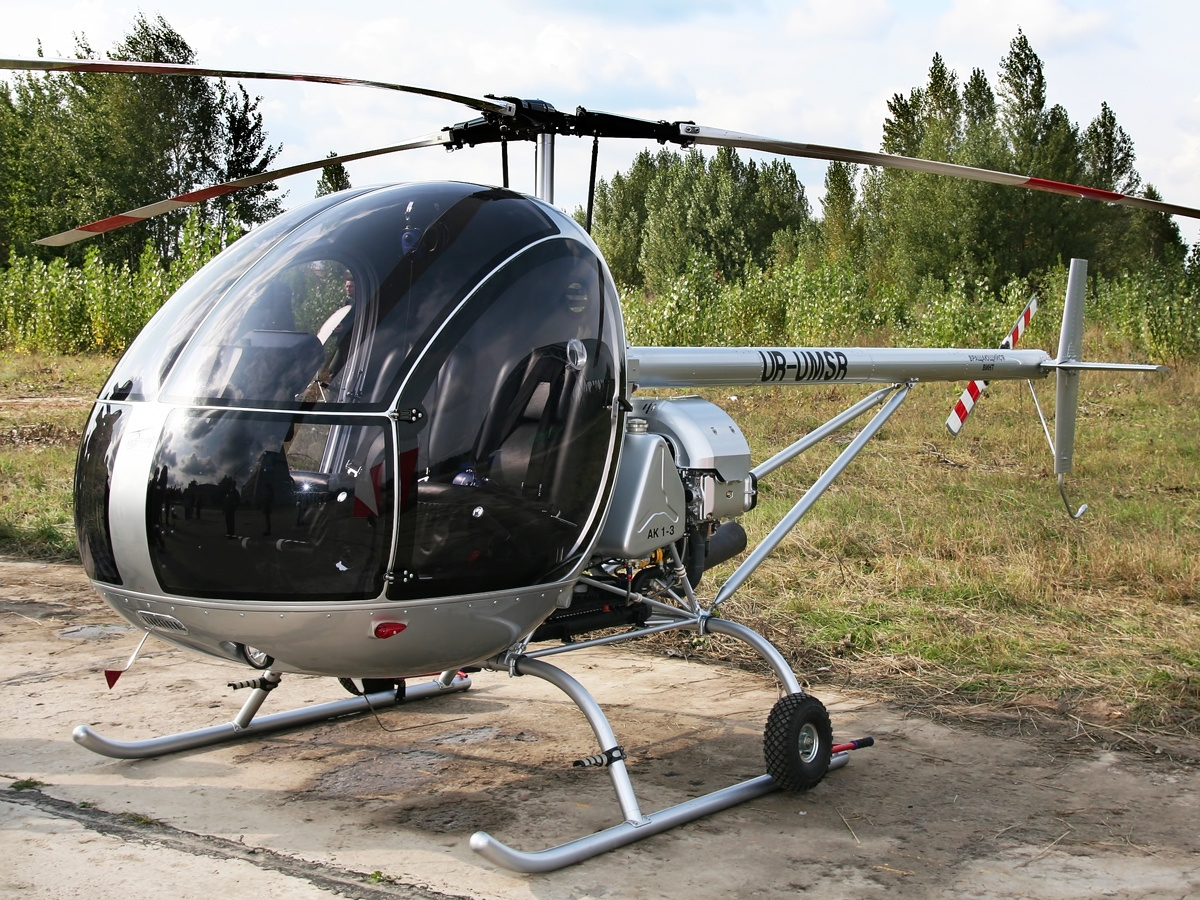
Aerocopter AK 1-3 San'ka

Aerokopter ZA-6 San'ka
Original design forming the basis of the AK1, with a five-bladed main rotor and powered by a 119 kW (160 hp) Subaru EJ22 converted automobile engine.
Aerokopter AK1-5
A development prototype modified from a ZA-6 with a five-bladed main rotor. Registered as GL-0478 and displayed at the 2002 Kyiv Manufacturing and Security Exhibition.
Aerokopter AK1-3
A second stage of development resulted in the AK1-3 with a three-bladed rotor, (also displayed incomplete at the 2002 Kyiv exhibition). Other changes included a tailplane with end-plate fins and tail rotor transferred to the right side of the tail boom.

== Specifications (AK1-3) ==
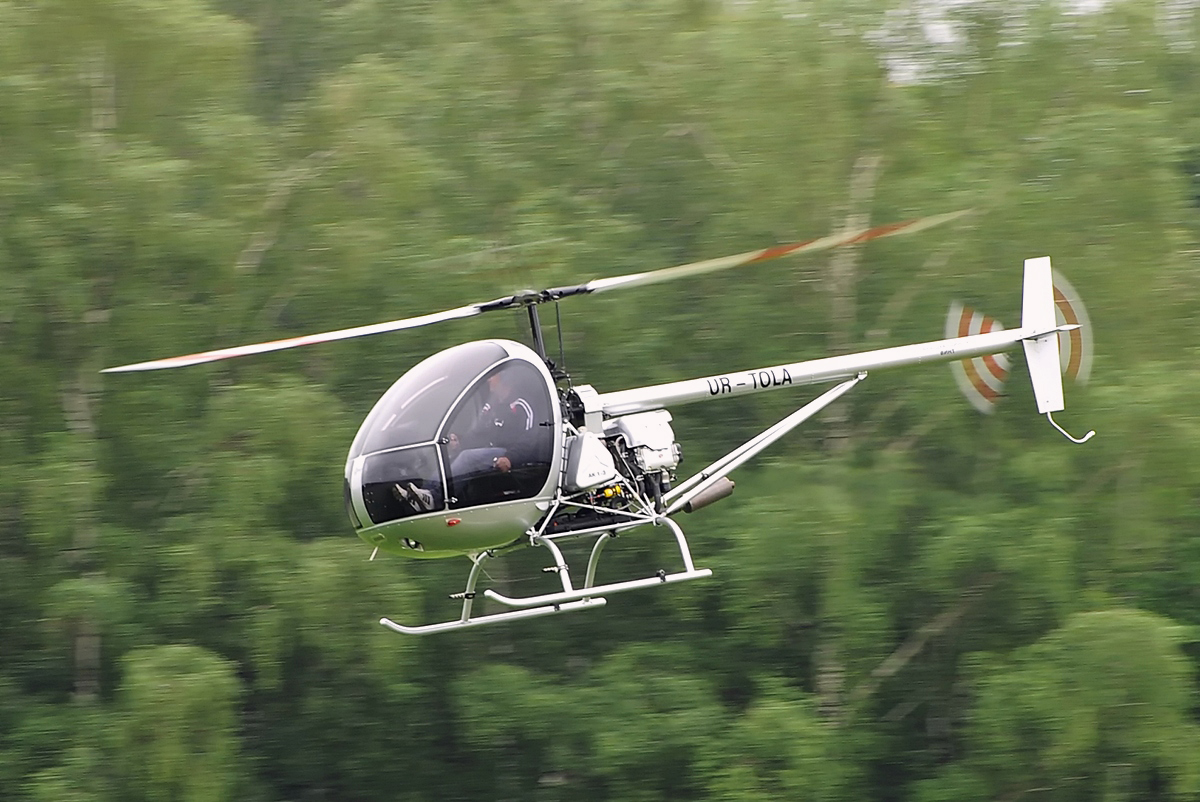
Aerokopter AK1-3 Sanka

Data from Bayerl and manufacturer

General characteristics

- Crew: one
- Capacity: one passenger
- Empty weight: 380 kg (838 lb)
- Gross weight: 650 kg (1,433 lb)
- Fuel capacity: 75 litres (16 imp gal; 20 US gal)
- Powerplant: 1 × Subaru EJ25 four cylinder, water-cooled, four stroke automotive engine, 116 kW (156 hp)
- Main rotor diameter: 6.84 m (22 ft 5 in)

Performance

- Maximum speed: 180 km/h (110 mph, 97 kn)
- Cruise speed: 160 km/h (99 mph, 86 kn)
- Rate of climb: 8 m/s (1,600 ft/min)

== See also ==
Aircraft of comparable role, configuration, and era

- Alpi Syton AH 130
- DF Helicopters DF334
- Dynali H2S
- Famà Kiss 209
- Heli-Sport CH-7
- LCA LH 212 Delta
- RotorWay Exec

Related lists

- List of personal air vehicles
- List of rotorcraft
- List of ultralight helicopters
