= DF Helicopters DF334 =

Italian light helicopter

DF334
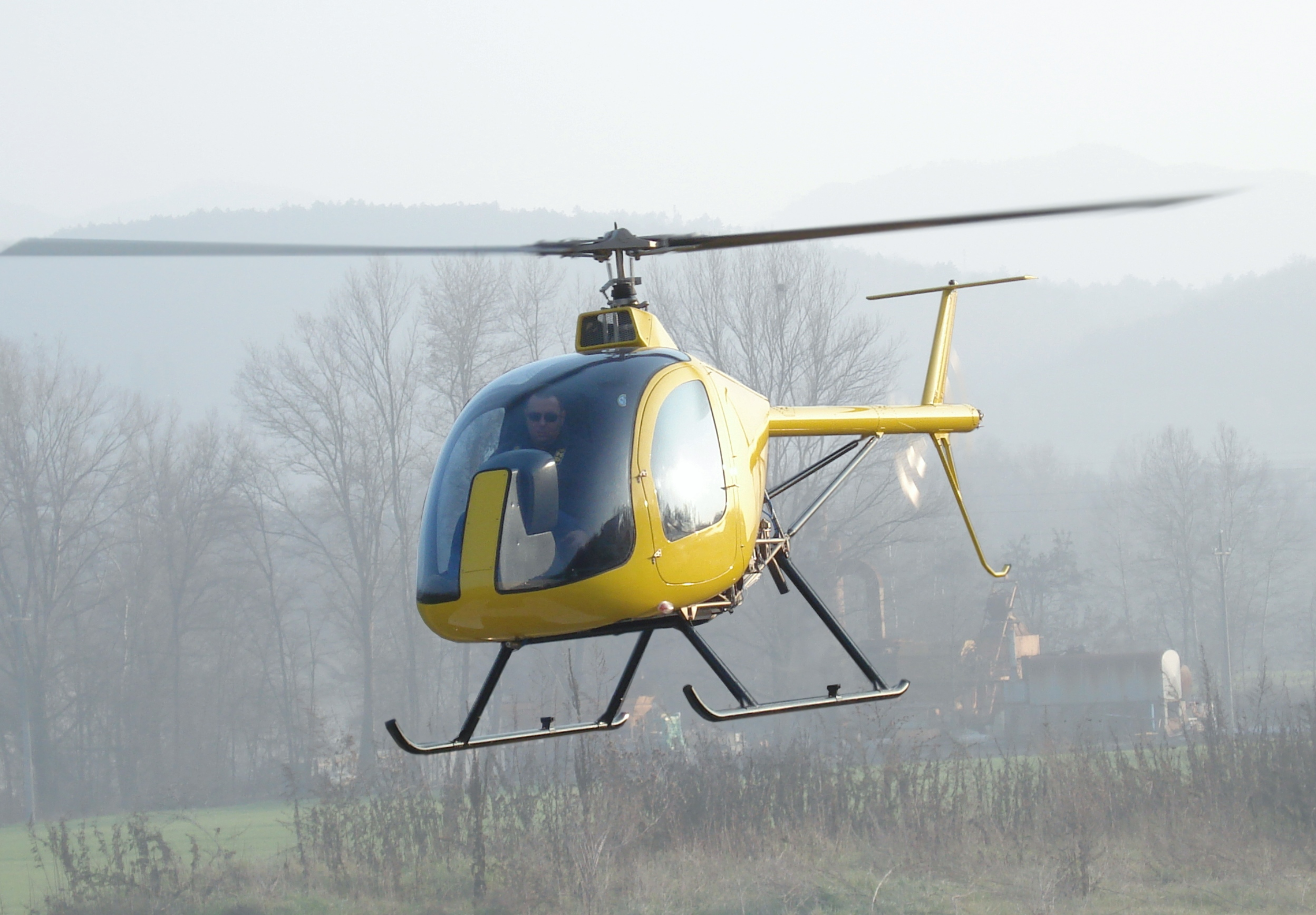
- DF334 during flight test

General information
- Type: Utility helicopter
- National origin: Italy
- Manufacturer: SD Aviation Srl, Mornago- VA, Italy
- Designer: Angelo and Alfredo Castiglioni

History
- First flight: 1989

The DF Helicopters DF334 is a two-seat, single-engine light utility helicopter in development by Dragon Fly Helicopters in Northern Italy. The DF 334 is a development of the Dragon Fly 333, developed by archaeologists and filmmakers Angelo and Alfredo Castiglioni in the 1980s. The DF334 has a larger, full composite cabin, a Rotax 914 4-stroke turbocharged engine, a governor fuel control, and an advanced Electronic Flight Instrument System. The helicopter is intended for both amateur and professional pilots.

At the beginning of 2024, DF Helicopters was acquired by SD Aviation Srl, along with all licensing rights. The current models, identified as DF334, and their unmanned versions equipped with original software, are now produced by SD Aviation Srl in Mornago, VA, Italy.

== Specifications ==
General characteristics

- Crew: One pilot
- Capacity: One passenger
- Length: 5.86 m (19 ft 3 in)
- Height: 2.36 m (7 ft 9 in)
- Empty weight: 290 kg (640 lb)
- Gross weight: 500 kg (1,100 lb)
- Powerplant: 1 × Rotax 914 , 84 kW (113 hp)
- Main rotor diameter: 6.82 m (22 ft 5 in)
- Main rotor area: 36.5 m^{2} (393 sq ft)

Performance

- Maximum speed: 148 km/h (92 mph, 80 kn)
- Cruise speed: 120 km/h (75 mph, 65 kn)
- Range: 300 km (190 mi, 160 nmi)
- Service ceiling: 3,100 m (10,200 ft)
- Rate of climb: 6.5 m/s (1,280 ft/min)

== See also ==
Aircraft of comparable role, configuration, and era

- Aerokopter AK1-3 Sanka
- Alpi Syton AH 130
- Dynali H2S
- Famà Kiss 209
- Heli-Sport CH-7
- LCA LH 212 Delta
- RotorWay Exec

Related lists

- List of rotorcraft
- List of ultralight helicopters
