= Hillberg EH1-01 RotorMouse =

American helicopter

EH1-01 RotorMouse

General information
- Type: Helicopter
- National origin: United States
- Manufacturer: Hillberg Helicopters
- Designer: Donald Gene Hillberg
- Status: Production completed
- Number built: At least one

History
- First flight: 1993

The Hillberg EH1-01 RotorMouse is an American helicopter that was designed by Donald Gene Hillberg and produced by Hillberg Helicopters of Fountain Valley, California, first flying in 1993. Now out of production, when it was available the aircraft was supplied as a kit for amateur construction.

== Design and development ==
The EH1-01 RotorMouse was designed to comply with the US Experimental - Amateur-built aircraft rules. It features a single main rotor, a two-bladed tail rotor, a single-seat enclosed cockpit with a windshield, skid-type landing gear. The acceptable power range is 145 to 250 hp (108 to 186 kW) and the standard engine used is a 145 hp (108 kW) Garrett AiResearch 36-55 auxiliary power unit (APU).

The aircraft's semi-monocoque fuselage is made from 2024-T3 aluminum sheet. Its 20 ft (6.1 m) diameter two-bladed rotor employs a NACA 0012 airfoil. The aircraft has an empty weight of 635 lb (288 kg) and a gross weight of 1,300 lb (590 kg), giving a useful load of 665 lb (302 kg). With full fuel of 33 U.S. gallons (120 L; 27 imp gal), located in a crash-resistant fuel cell, the payload for pilot and baggage is 441 lb (200 kg). The cabin width is 24 in (61 cm) and the aircraft mounts stub wings similar to the Bell AH-1 HueyCobra.

== Operational history ==
By 1998 the company reported that one aircraft was completed and flying.

By March 2015 one example had been registered in the United States with the Federal Aviation Administration. The sole one on the registry was in the name of the designer.

== Variants ==
EH1-01 RotorMouse
Single seat version, one completed
EH1-02 TandemMouse
Proposed two seats-in-tandem version to resemble the Bell AH-1 HueyCobra. It was proposed to have been powered by a Solar T-62 turbine engine of 150 hp (112 kW).

== Specifications (EH1-01 RotorMouse) ==
Data from Purdy

General characteristics

- Crew: one
- Length: 20.10 ft (6.13 m)
- Airfoil: NACA 0012
- Empty weight: 635 lb (288 kg)
- Gross weight: 1,300 lb (590 kg)
- Fuel capacity: 33 U.S. gallons (120 L; 27 imp gal)
- Powerplant: 1 × Garrett AiResearch 36-55 turbine auxiliary power unit, 145 hp (108 kW)
- Main rotor diameter: × 20 ft 0 in (6.10 m)
- Main rotor area: 314 sq ft (29.2 m^{2})

Performance

- Maximum speed: 160 mph (260 km/h, 140 kn)
- Cruise speed: 130 mph (210 km/h, 110 kn)
- Range: 300 mi (480 km, 260 nmi)
- Rate of climb: 2,700 ft/min (14 m/s)
- Disk loading: 4.1 lb/sq ft (20 kg/m^{2})

== See also ==
- List of rotorcraft
