= Dragonfly (comics) =

Dragonfly, in comics, may refer to:

- Dragonfly (AC Comics), an AC Comics superheroine
- Dragonfly (DC Comics), a DC Comics supervillainess
- Dragonfly (Marvel Comics), a Marvel Comics supervillainess

== See also ==
- Dragonfly (disambiguation)
