= Hillberg Helicopters =

American helicopter manufacturer

- Company type: Privately held company
- Industry: Aerospace
- Founder: Donald Gene Hillberg
- Defunct: after 1998
- Fate: Out of business
- Headquarters: Fountain Valley, California, United States
- Products: Kit aircraft

Hillberg Helicopters was an American aircraft manufacturer based in Fountain Valley, California and founded by Donald Gene Hillberg. The company specialized in the design and manufacture of helicopters in the form of kits for amateur construction.

The company offered a turbine conversion kit for the Rotorway Exec, using a Solar T62 auxiliary power unit engine to create the Hillberg Turbine Exec. The Hillberg EH1-01 RotorMouse was a single-seat helicopter with stub-wings. At least one example of each design was flown.

A Hillberg EH1-02 TandemMouse, two-seats-in-tandem version of the RotorMouse design was proposed and construction of a prototype commenced.

== Aircraft ==
Summary of aircraft built by Hillberg Helicopters
| Model name | First flight | Number built | Type |
|---|---|---|---|
| Hillberg Turbine Exec | 1990s | at least one | Turbine conversion of the Rotorway Exec |
| Hillberg EH1-01 RotorMouse | 1993 | at least one | Turbine single-seat helicopter |
