= Dynali =

Belgian aircraft manufacturer

Dynali Helicopter Company
- Company type: Privately held company
- Industry: Aerospace
- Founded: early 1980s
- Headquarters: Nivelles, Belgium
- Key people: Chairman: Thierry Blanchart
- Products: Helicopters
- Website: www.dynali.com

The Dynali Helicopter Company is a Belgian aircraft manufacturer. The company specializes in the design and manufacture of microlight helicopters in the form of kits for amateur construction and ready-to-fly aircraft.

The 1,200 m^{2} (13,000 sq ft) production plant is located 30 km south of Brussels, in the Thines district of Nivelles.

The company chairman is Thierry Blanchart.

== History ==
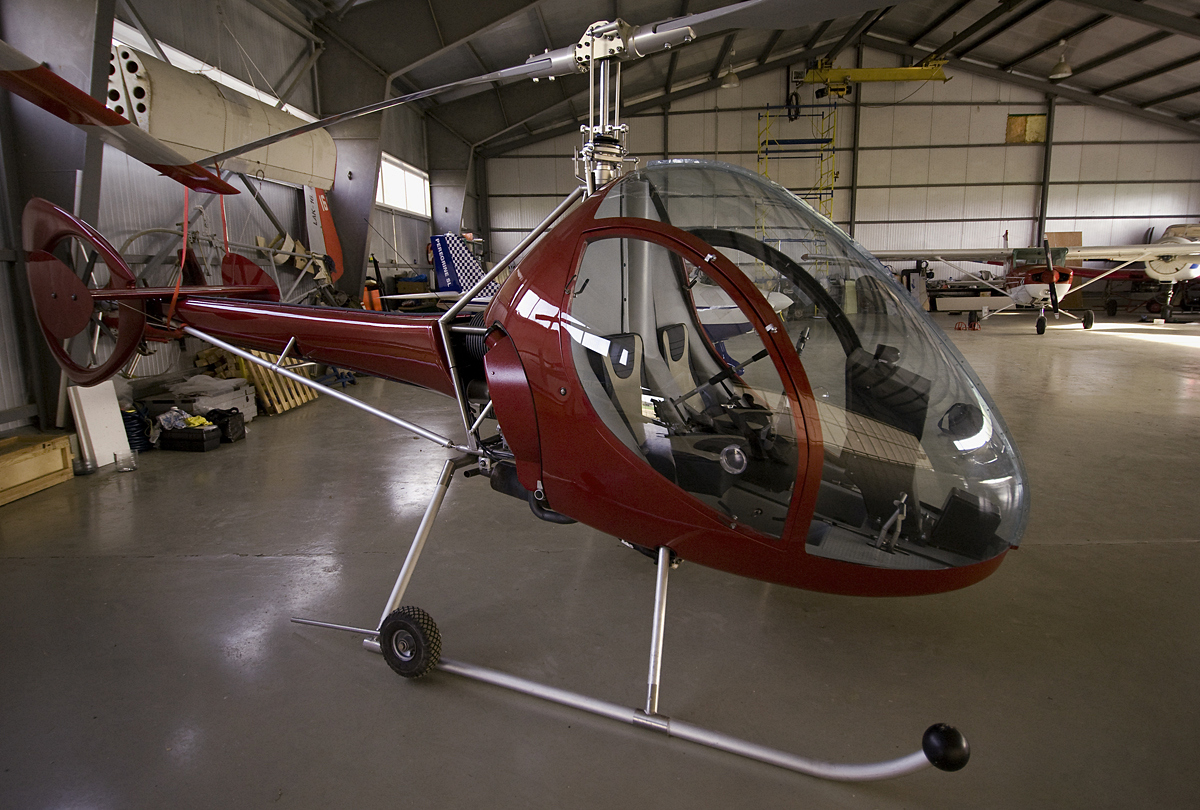
Dynali H2S

The company was founded in the early 1980s as just Dynali. It started as a fixed wing ultralight aircraft builder, constructing over 1000 Dynali Chickinox aircraft.

As new materials became available, such as carbon fibre, the company raised the capital from a shareholder to branch out into helicopter design and the name was changed to the Dynali Helicopter Company. New European microlight helicopter regulations introduced in 2011 allowed production to start and the company produced the H2 and later the H3. The H3 became the sole product in the mid 2010s, superseding the H2 in production.

Dynali helicopters have been sold in France and South Korea.

== Aircraft ==
Summary of aircraft built by Dynali:

- Dynali Chickinox
- Dynali H2S
- Dynali H3
