= Winner B150 =

Belgian kit helicopter

General information
- Type: Helicopter
- National origin: Belgium
- Manufacturer: Winner SCS
- Status: Production completed (2017)

The Winner B150 is a Belgian helicopter that was designed and produced by Winner SBS of Dinant. Now out of production, when it was available the aircraft was supplied complete and ready-to-fly-aircraft or as a kit for amateur construction.

== Design and development ==
The B150 was designed to comply with the French CNSK rules. It features a single main rotor and tail rotor, a two-seats-in side-by-side configuration enclosed cockpit with a bubble windshield, skid landing gear and a 160 hp (119 kW) Solar T62T-32 turboshaft engine.

The aircraft fuselage is made from aluminum and composites. Its two-bladed rotor has a diameter of 7.67 m (25.2 ft) and a chord of 19 cm (7.5 in). The aircraft has a typical empty weight of 400 kg (882 lb) and a gross weight of 700 kg (1,543 lb), giving a useful load of 300 kg (661 lb). With full fuel of 165 litres (36 imp gal; 44 US gal) the payload for the pilot, passenger and baggage is 157 kg (346 lb).

Reviewer Werner Pfaendler, describes the design as providing "easy and fun flying".

Production of the B150 was suspended due to deficiencies in the Solar T62 powerplant. The company said, "it was decided to abandon the Solar T62 turbine; this second-hand power source appeared to be obsolete, difficult to find in a proper condition and with limited performance". Instead the company redesigned the airframe to accept a 200 hp (149 kW) piston engine as the B200 and also a 250 hp (186 kW) TS100 turboshaft engine as the B250.

== Specifications (B150) ==
Data from Tacke

General characteristics

- Crew: one
- Capacity: one passenger
- Empty weight: 400 kg (882 lb)
- Gross weight: 700 kg (1,543 lb)
- Fuel capacity: 165 litres (36 imp gal; 44 US gal)
- Powerplant: 1 × Solar T62T-32 turboshaft aircraft engine, 120 kW (160 hp)
- Main rotor diameter: 7.67 m (25 ft 2 in)
- Main rotor area: 46 m^{2} (500 sq ft)

Performance

- Maximum speed: 189 km/h (117 mph, 102 kn)
- Cruise speed: 165 km/h (103 mph, 89 kn)
- Rate of climb: 6 m/s (1,200 ft/min)
- Disk loading: 15.2 kg/m^{2} (3.1 lb/sq ft)

== See also ==
- List of rotorcraft
