= Auroa Helicopters Auroa =

New Zealand helicopter

General information
- Type: Helicopter
- National origin: New Zealand
- Manufacturer: Auroa Helicopters Limited
- Status: In production (2015)

History
- Introduction date: 2013
- First flight: 2011

The Auroa Helicopters Auroa is a New Zealand helicopter designed and produced by Auroa Helicopters Limited of Manaia, Taranaki, introduced in 2013. The aircraft is supplied complete and ready-to-fly.

== Design and development ==
The Auroa was designed to comply with the New Zealand and European Class 6 microlight helicopter rules. It features a single main rotor and tail rotor, a two-seats-in side-by-side configuration enclosed cockpit with a windshield, skid landing gear and a 160 hp (119 kW) Solar T62 turbine engine.

The aircraft fuselage is made from a combination of metal tubing and composites. Its two-bladed rotor has a diameter of 6 m (19.7 ft). The tail rotor has four blades and a protective ring. The aircraft has a typical empty weight of 310 kg (683 lb) and a gross weight of 600 kg (1,323 lb) (544 kg (1,199 lb) for the microlight class), giving a useful load of 290 kg (639 lb) (234 kg (516 lb) for the microlight class).

Reviewer Werner Pfaendler, describes the design as "elegant".

First flown in 2011, the three prototypes accumulated 130 flying hours by the end of that year.

== Specifications (Auroa) ==
Data from Tacke and manufacturer

General characteristics

- Crew: one
- Capacity: one passenger
- Empty weight: 310 kg (683 lb)
- Gross weight: 600 kg (1,323 lb)
- Powerplant: 1 × Solar T62 turbine engine, 120 kW (160 hp)
- Main rotor diameter: 6 m (19 ft 8 in)
- Main rotor area: 28.26 m^{2} (304.2 sq ft)

Performance

- Maximum speed: 170 km/h (110 mph, 92 kn)
- Cruise speed: 150 km/h (93 mph, 81 kn)
- Never exceed speed: 170 km/h (100 mph, 90 kn)
- Endurance: 2 hours
- Rate of climb: 6 m/s (1,200 ft/min)
- Disk loading: 21.2 kg/m^{2} (4.3 lb/sq ft)

== See also ==
- List of rotorcraft
