= AeroTwin AT972T =

American aircraft engine

AT972T
- Type: Aircraft engine
- National origin: United States
- Manufacturer: AeroTwin Motors Corporation

The AeroTwin AT972T is an American aircraft engine, designed and produced by the AeroTwin Motors Corporation, a subsidiary of the AirScooter Corporation of Henderson, Nevada for use in ultralight aircraft, in particular their AirScooter helicopter design.

The company seems to have been founded about 2002 and gone out of business in 2012 and production ended.

== Design and development ==
The engine is a twin-cylinder four-stroke, in-line, 972 cc (59.3 cu in) displacement, air and oil-cooled, gasoline engine design, with either a poly V belt or mechanical gearbox reduction drive with a clutch and reduction ratios of 1.88, 2.00 and 2.14:1. It employs dual electronic ignition and produces 65 hp (48 kW) at 4200 rpm, with a compression ratio of 8.0:1.

== Specifications (AT972T) ==
Data from Tacke

=== General characteristics ===
- Type: Twin cylinder, inline, four stroke aircraft engine
- Bore: 102 mm (4.0 in)
- Stroke: 60 mm (2.4 in)
- Displacement: 972 cc (59.3 cu in)
- Dry weight: 45 kg (99 lb)

=== Components ===
- Fuel type: gasoline
- Cooling system: air/oil

=== Performance ===
- Power output: 65 hp (48 kW)
- Compression ratio: 8.0:1

== See also ==
Related lists

- List of aircraft engines
