= Hillberg Turbine Exec =

American helicopter

Turbine Exec

General information
- Type: Helicopter
- National origin: United States
- Manufacturer: Hillberg Helicopters
- Status: Production completed
- Number built: At least one

History
- Developed from: Rotorway Exec

The Hillberg Turbine Exec is an American helicopter turbine engine conversion kit for the piston-engined Rotorway Exec. It was designed and produced by Hillberg Helicopters of Fountain Valley, California. Now out of production, when it was available the kit was supplied for installation by amateur aircraft builders.

== Design and development ==
The kit was designed specifically for the Rotorway Exec, to convert it to turbine power, under the US Experimental - Amateur-built aircraft rules. The resulting aircraft features a single main rotor, a two-seats-in side-by-side configuration enclosed cockpit with a windshield, skid-type landing gear and a 150 hp (112 kW) Solar T62 turbo-shaft engine. The T62 was designed as an auxiliary power unit (APU) and used on helicopters such as the Boeing-Vertol CH-47 Chinook and Boeing-Vertol CH-46A Sea Knight. Due to the light weight of the engine used for the conversion kit, the aircraft's empty weight is reduced and the useful load is increased.

The Hillberg Turbine Exec uses airframe components from the Exec and thus the completed aircraft's fuselage is made from aluminum and steel tubing, plus fiberglass for the cockpit fairing. Its two-bladed main rotor has a diameter of 25 ft (7.6 m). The aircraft has an empty weight of 750 lb (340 kg) and a gross weight of 1,485 lb (674 kg), giving a useful load of 735 lb (333 kg). The cabin width is 40 in (102 cm).

The Hillberg conversion kit included the T62 engine, reduction gear clutch, tail rotor drive shaft and hangar bearings, main transmission and a new fuel tank.

== Operational history ==
By March 2015 one example had been registered in the United States with the Federal Aviation Administration.

== Specifications (Turbine Exec) ==
Data from Purdy

General characteristics

- Crew: one
- Capacity: one passenger
- Length: 22 ft 0 in (6.71 m)
- Empty weight: 750 lb (340 kg)
- Gross weight: 1,485 lb (674 kg)
- Powerplant: 1 × Solar T62 gas turbine turbo-shaft aircraft engine, 150 hp (112 kW)
- Main rotor diameter: 25 ft 0 in (7.62 m)
- Main rotor area: 490 sq ft (46 m^{2})

Performance

- Maximum speed: 125 mph (201 km/h, 109 kn)
- Range: 225 mi (362 km, 196 nmi)
- Service ceiling: 13,500 ft (4,100 m)
- Disk loading: 3.03 lb/sq ft (14.8 kg/m^{2})

== See also ==
- List of rotorcraft
