= AirScooter Corporation =

American aircraft manufacturer

- Company type: Publicly held company
- Industry: Aerospace
- Founded: 2000
- Defunct: by 2013
- Fate: Out of business
- Headquarters: Henderson, Nevada, United States
- Products: Ultralight helicopters, aircraft engines
- Website: airscooter.com

AirScooter Corporation (OTC Pink: ASCO) is a defunct American aircraft manufacturer that was based in Henderson, Nevada. It designed and intended to manufacture an ultralight helicopter, with a coaxial rotor configuration. The company was founded in early 2000 by Elwood "Woody" Norris, who served as chairman of the board, and James "Jim" Barnes, who served as secretary of the board. The company was out of business by 2013.

== Products ==
The company's proposed product, perpetually under development, was the single-seat AirScooter II, which was intended to be classified as an ultralight aircraft. It was expected to weigh 254 lbs and be powered by a single 65 hp four-stroke engine capable of carrying a load of up to 350 lb. Although its operating ceiling was to be around 10,000 ft (2,700 m), the AirScooter II has fixed pitch rotors and was incapable of an autorotative emergency descent, and was intended for recreational flying at low altitude, i.e., at or below 50 ft (15 m) above ground level (AGL).

Production of the AirScooter II was originally expected to begin in 2005, but production was pushed back to 2006 and then later targeted for 2007. As of September, 2013, production had not yet been announced and the company's website had been taken down. There have been no major press releases or other production information published since 2007.

== AeroTwin Motors Corporation ==
Between 2002 and 2012 the company had a subsidiary, the AeroTwin Motors Corporation that developed the AeroTwin AT972T aircraft engine.
