= Virginia State Route 250 =

The following highways in Virginia have been known as State Route 250:

- State Route 250 (Virginia 1933), 1933 – mid-1930s, spur of U.S. Route 220 to Crabbottom
- U.S. Route 250 in Virginia, mid-1930s – present
