= SS Dragonfly =

British steamship (1883-1889)

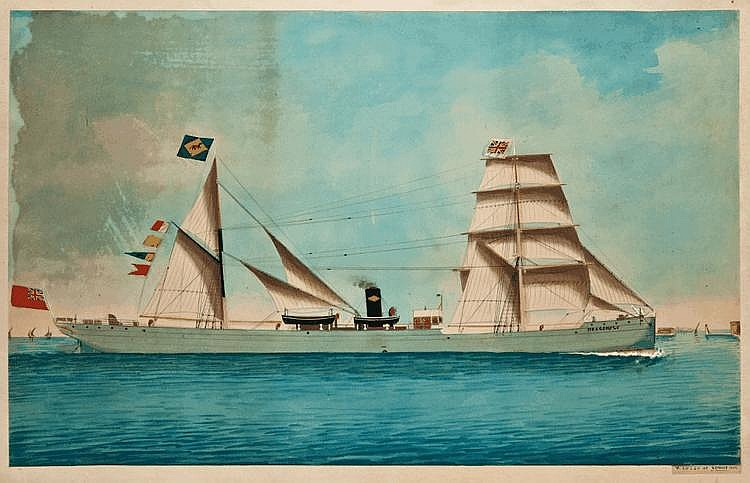
- SS Dragonfly in 1884; painted by Vincenzo Luzzo

History

United Kingdom
- Name: Dragonfly
- Namesake: Dragonfly
- Owner: Galbraith, Pembroke & Co., London
- Builder: William Gray & Company, West Hartlepool
- Launched: 23 April 1883
- Out of service: 9 December 1889
- Identification: NCN ID: 19702
- Fate: Stranded and wrecked, December 1889

General characteristics
- Tonnage: 1,761 GRT
- Length: 78.5 m (258 ft)
- Beam: 10.5 m (34 ft)
- Crew: 22

SS Dragonfly was a British cargo steamship. She was built by William Gray & Company in West Hartlepool and launched on 23 April 1883. The ship was owned by Galbraith, Pembroke & Co. in London.

The ship stranded and wrecked in the Netherlands in December 1889. The crew was rescued.

== Building ==
SS Dragonfly was built by William Gray & Company in West Hartlepool in 1883. She was made of steel and was assessed at 1,761 GRT. She was 78.5 m (258 ft) long and had a beam of 10.5 m (34 ft).

== History and fate ==
The ship was launched on 23 April 1883 and was owned by Galbraith, Pembroke & Co..

Map of the Netherlands with position of Dragonfly's wreck

In December 1889 she was on a voyage with a cargo of rye from Taganrog, Russia to Amsterdam, North Holland, Netherlands under command of captain J. Howling.

While approaching her final destination, it was not possible to get a pilot on board. Because of that the ship returned back to the sea. Through dense mist, she was driven ashore at “Pannekoek” in the Nieuwediep, the Netherlands. They let off flares as a distress signal. It was seen by the tug “Hercules” that was in the neighborhood near a stranded ship “Karoon”. “Hercules” sailed to the harbor and returned after two hours together with a lifeboat. The rescue operation was difficult due to the weather and darkness, but all 22 crew members were rescued by two voyages of the lifeboat. The crew was brought at around 3AM (local time) into the “Hercules” and brought ashore.

On 9 December the ship floated to Noorderhaaks during high tide, which was very unfavorable for the ship. During the morning of 10 December at least five boats started unloading cargo of rye. The ships stopped during high tide. A Belgian tug and two blazer ships were able to refloat the ship. However, because they sailed in the wrong direction, the ship stranded again. The tugs “Hercules” and “Simson” were not able during the evening to refloat her. The ship sank into the sand with only the chimney still visible. Research revealed that the ship broke and was considered lost. The ship broke into two pieces and sank further into the sand. At low tide the bow and stern surfaced a little.

On 11 December a small black painted boat marked “SS Dragonfy” washes ashore on Texel. A mast and shutters also washed ashore.

On 20 December a public sale took place of the savaged inventory and the wreck with the remaining cargo. The inventory had a revenue of f 1000 and the wreck was bought by L.W.F. Oudenhoven for f 444.

In January 1890 blazer “TX 25”, that spent several days investigating the ship, salvaged three davits and a chain. As the ship was too far under water (12 foot), nothing of the cargo could be salvaged.
