= Dynali H3 EasyFlyer =

Belgian kit helicopter

H3 EasyFlyer
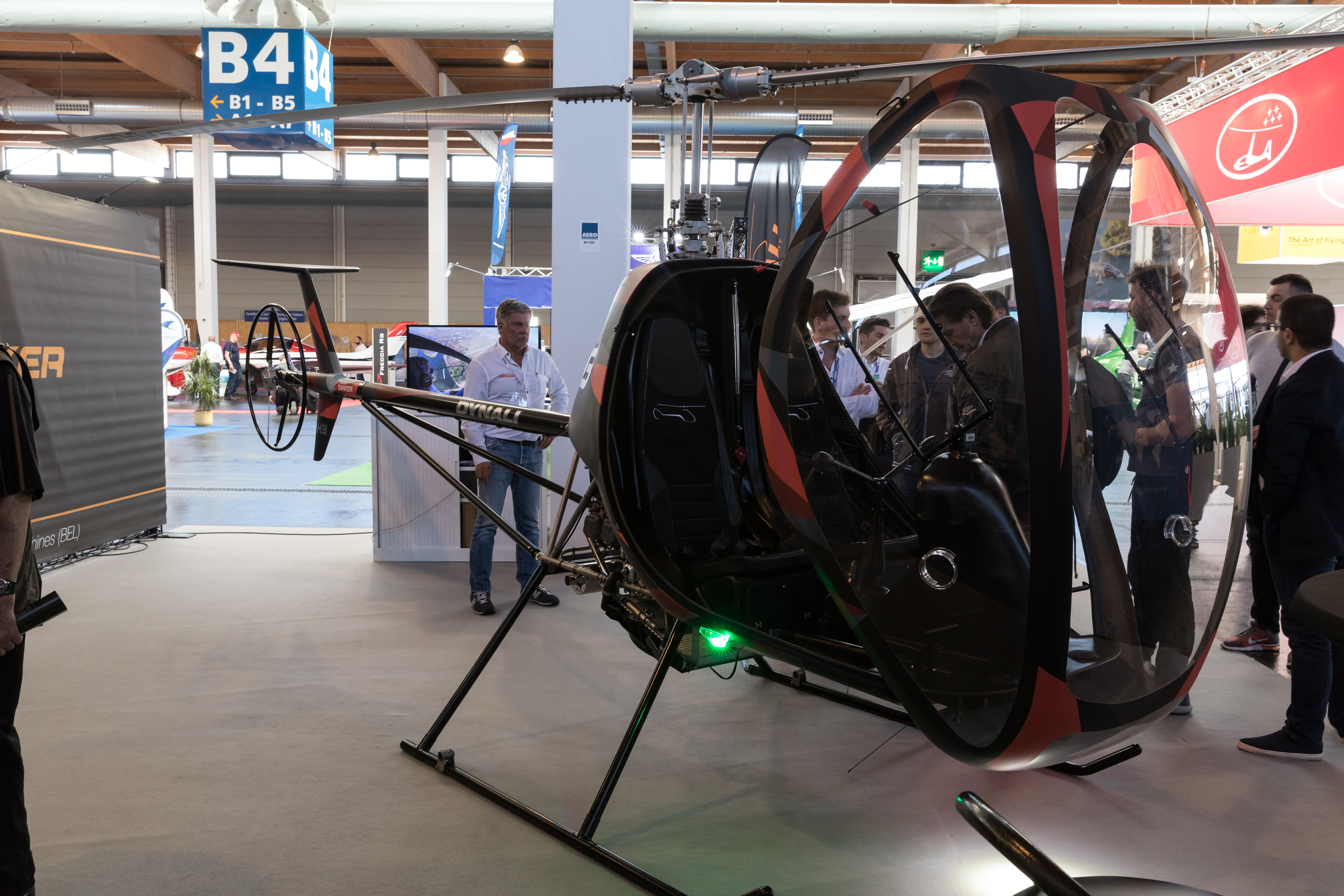

General information
- Type: Helicopter
- National origin: Belgium
- Manufacturer: Dynali Helicopter Company
- Status: In production (2017)

The Dynali H3 EasyFlyer, now known as the Sport, is a Belgian helicopter designed and produced by the Dynali of the Thines district of Nivelles. The aircraft is supplied complete and ready-to-fly-aircraft or as a kit for amateur construction.

== Design and development ==
The H3 was designed for the flight training, utility and personal-use roles. It was designed to comply with the European Class 6 microlight helicopter rules, in particular the French Class 6 Microlight Category, at a gross weight of 450 kg (992 lb). It features a single main rotor and tail rotor, a two-seats-in side-by-side configuration enclosed cockpit with a bubble canopy, skid landing gear and a four-cylinder, liquid and air-cooled, four stroke 100 hp (75 kW) Rotax 912ULS engine, a Dynali-developed fuel-injected 110 hp (82 kW) conversion Rotax 912ULS-1 engine or a 115 hp (86 kW) turbocharged Rotax 914 powerplant.

The aircraft's gross weight varies from 450 kg (992 lb) for the microlight category, with heavier weights available depending on installed power in other national categories, such as light-sport aircraft. With the Rotax 912ULS engine, the gross weight is 500 kg (1,102 lb), 550 kg (1,213 lb) with the Rotax 912ULS-1 and 600 kg (1,323 lb) with the Rotax 914.

The aircraft fuselage frame is made from welded stainless steel tubing. Its two-bladed rotor has a diameter of 7.14 m (23.4 ft) and a chord of 18.5 cm (7.3 in). With the Rotax 914 engine the aircraft has a typical empty weight of 290 kg (639 lb) and a gross weight of 600 kg (1,323 lb), giving a useful load of 310 kg (683 lb). With full fuel of 60 litres (13 imp gal; 16 US gal) the payload for the pilot, passenger and baggage is 267 kg (589 lb).

== Specifications (H3) ==
Data from Tacke and manufacturer

General characteristics

- Crew: one
- Capacity: one passenger
- Empty weight: 285 kg (628 lb)
- Gross weight: 500 kg (1,102 lb) in the LSA category
- Fuel capacity: 60 litres (13 imp gal; 16 US gal)
- Powerplant: 1 × Rotax 912ULS four cylinder, liquid and air-cooled, four stroke aircraft engine, 75 kW (100 hp)
- Main rotor diameter: 7.14 m (23 ft 5 in)
- Main rotor area: 40 m^{2} (430 sq ft)

Performance

- Cruise speed: 130 km/h (81 mph, 70 kn)
- Never exceed speed: 155 km/h (96 mph, 84 kn)
- Endurance: 3 hours
- Service ceiling: 3,000 m (10,000 ft)
- Rate of climb: 4.6 m/s (900 ft/min)
- Disk loading: 12.5 kg/m^{2} (2.6 lb/sq ft)

== See also ==
- List of rotorcraft
- Dynali H2S
