= CHI KC 518 Adventourer =

KC 518 Adventourer
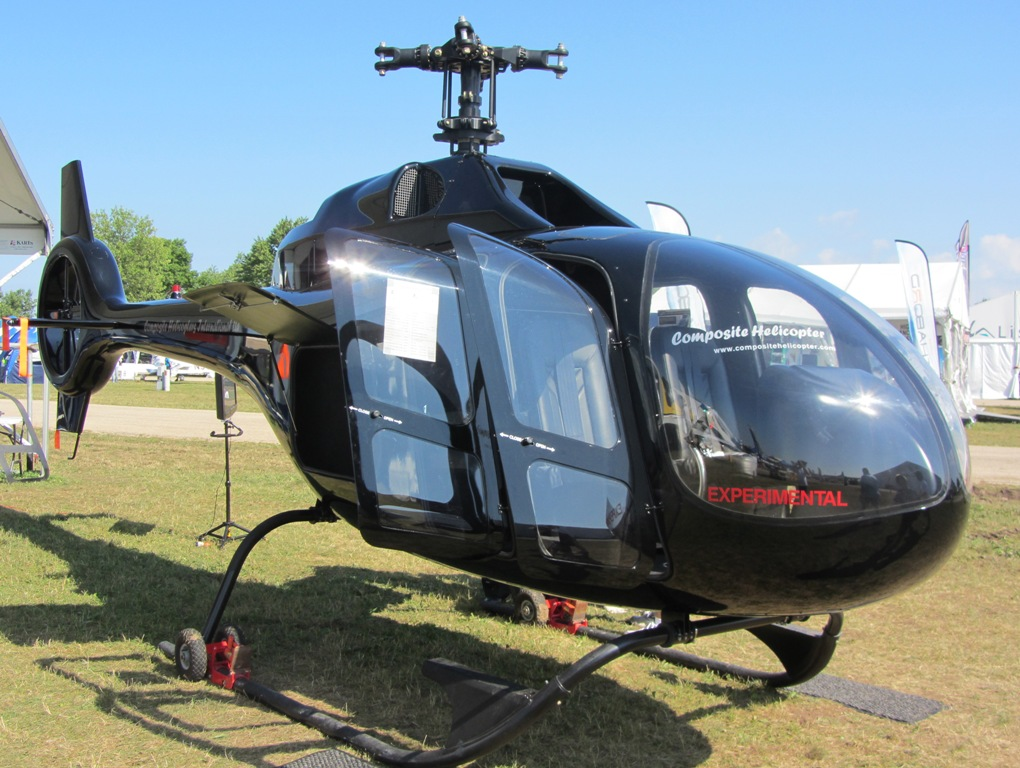

General information
- Type: Helicopter
- National origin: New Zealand
- Manufacturer: Composite Helicopters International
- Designer: Peter Maloney
- Number built: 2

History
- First flight: 8 May 2012

The Composite Helicopters International KC 518 Adventourer is a composite fuselage, 5-6 place turbine kit helicopter.

== Design ==
The KC 518 is a composite fuselage helicopter kit for amateur construction. The airframe uses a carbon fiber and kevlar composite fuselage with a shrouded tail rotor. An auxiliary fuel system can be installed.

== Variants ==
Other versions with the same fuselage are KC630 with Rolls-Royce RR300 engine in 2017 (priced at US$970,000), KC640 with the RR250 in 2018, and KC650 with the Honeywell LTS101, expected to be certified by 2019. The rights to the KC630 were acquired by Innova Helicopters in 2017.

== Specifications (KC 518 Adventourer) ==
Data from Manufacturer

General characteristics

- Crew: 1
- Capacity: 5 passengers
- Length: 8.8 m (28 ft 10 in)
- Width: 1.46 m (4 ft 9 in)
- Height: 3.5 m (11 ft 6 in)
- Airfoil: MRB VR7b
- Empty weight: 794 kg (1,750 lb)
- Gross weight: 1,542 kg (3,400 lb)
- Max takeoff weight: 1,542 kg (3,400 lb)
- Powerplant: 1 × Rolls-Royce RR250T63-700 Turboshaft, 240 kW (320 hp)
- Main rotor diameter: × 9.018 m (29 ft 7 in)

Performance

- Cruise speed: 250 km/h (155 mph, 135 kn)
- Never exceed speed: 300 km/h (180 mph, 160 kn)
- Endurance: 3.6hr
- Service ceiling: 4,300 m (14,000 ft)
- Rate of climb: 5.1 m/s (1,000 ft/min)

== Test flight crashes ==
At about 11:15am on 7 May 2013, while on a test flight Pilot Peter Maloney and his female passenger were rescued uninjured after ditching in the Hauraki Gulf, New Zealand.

At about 9:30am on 8 November 2014, while on a test flight Pilot Peter Maloney and his co-pilot, Norbert Idelon were uninjured after a heavy landing near Silverdale, Auckland due to suspected mechanical problems.

== See also ==
Aircraft of comparable role, configuration, and era

- Vertical Hummingbird
- MD Helicopters MD 500
- Eurocopter EC120 Colibri
- Bell 206
- Robinson R44
- Robinson R66
