= Castiglioni Dragon Fly 333 =

DF 333

General information
- Type: Utility helicopter
- National origin: Italy
- Manufacturer: Dragon Fly srl
- Designer: Angelo and Alfredo Castiglioni

The Dragon Fly 333 is an ultralight utility helicopter developed by archaeologists and filmmakers Angelo and Alfredo Castiglioni in the 1990s. French UAV manufacturer CAC Systèmes created a drone version named the Héliot for use in reconnaissance and as an aerial target, but the aircraft did not enter production.

DF Helicopters was acquired in 2010 by a Swiss Group, Avio International Group.

== Variants ==
- Dragon Fly 333 - initial version
- Dragon Fly 333 AC - RAI-VLR certified version
- CAC Systèmes Héliot - drone version
- Dragon Fly 333 ULR - ultralight version

== Specifications (333) ==
Data from Jane's All the World's Aircraft 1999--.00

General characteristics

- Crew: One pilot
- Capacity: One passenger
- Length: 7.86 m (25 ft 10 in)
- Height: 2.36 m (7 ft 9 in)
- Wing area: 35.2 m^{2} (379 sq ft)
- Empty weight: 260 kg (573 lb)
- Gross weight: 500 kg (1,100 lb)
- Powerplant: 1 × Hirth F30A26AK , 82 kW (110 hp)
- Main rotor diameter: 6.70 m (22 ft 0 in)
- Main rotor area: 36.5 m^{2} (393 sq ft)

Performance

- Maximum speed: 135 km/h (83 mph, 72 kn)
- Cruise speed: 130 km/h (70 mph, 61 kn)
- Range: 310 km (190 mi, 170 nmi)
- Service ceiling: 3,100 m (10,000 ft)
- Rate of climb: 6.5 m/s (1,280 ft/min)

== Bibliography ==
- Jane's All the World's Aircraft 2004-05. London: Jane's Information Group.
- Simpson, R. W. (1998). Airlife's Helicopters and Rotorcraft. Ramsbury: Airlife Publishing. p. 216.
- Aviazione Sportiva (108). March 2008.
