= Solar T62 =

Type of aircraft engine

T62
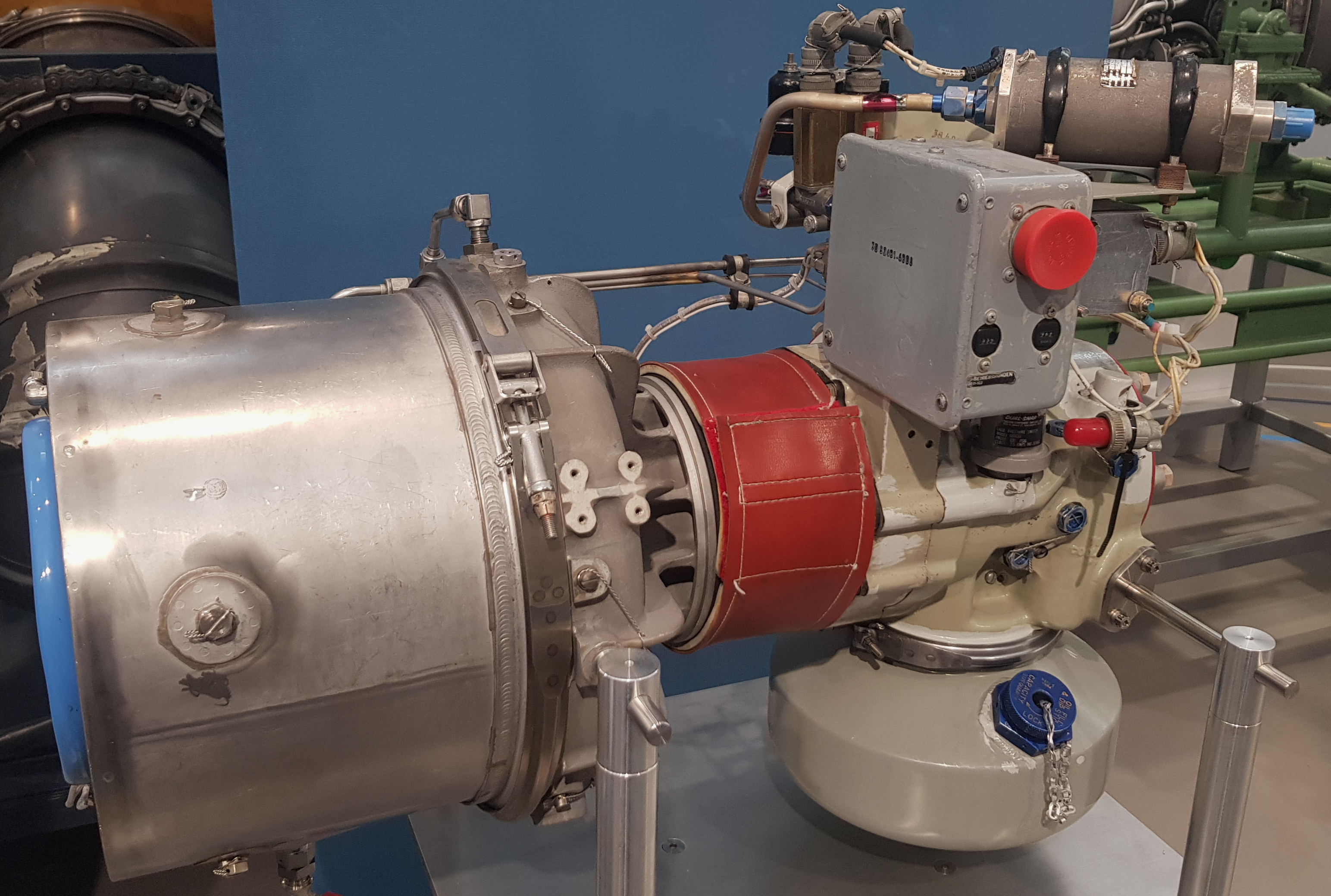
- Solar T62T-27 engine used as auxiliary power unit (APU)
- National origin: United States
- First run: 1950s

The Solar T62 Titan is an American gas turbine engine used mainly as an aircraft auxiliary power unit (APU), conventional power generator, turboprop engine for fixed-wing aircraft or turboshaft engine for helicopters. A new turbine version was developed as the Solar T66.

== Variants ==
T62 Titan
The direct drive main production version.
T62T-2
80 hp (60 kW) at 56,700 turbine rpm for Boeing-Vertol CH-47A Chinook helicopters.
T62T-2A
95 hp (71 kW) at 56,700 turbine rpm for Boeing-Vertol CH-47B / C Chinook helicopters.
T62T-11
80 hp (60 kW) at 56,700 turbine rpm for Boeing-Vertol CH-46A Sea Knight helicopters.
T62T-12
105 hp (78 kW) at 61,240 turbine rpm
T62T-16 / -16A1
95 hp (71 kW) for Sikorsky CH-3, Sikorsky SH-3 and Sikorsky CH-54A Skycrane helicopters at 56,700 turbine rpm, with 8,000 and 8,100 rpm outputs.
T62T-25
Turboshaft - 80 hp (60 kW) at 56,700 turbine rpm
T62T-27
Turboshaft - 150 hp (110 kW) at 61,250 turbine rpm, with 1x 8,000 and 1x 8,216 rpm outputs.
T62T-29
Turboshaft - 95 hp (71 kW) at 56,700 turbine rpm, for Lockheed Jetstar and Pan American Falcon business Jets at 56,700 turbine rpm, with 1x 8,000 and 1x 8,100 rpm outputs.
T62T-32A
150 hp (110 kW) at 61,250 rpm. Military Ground Power Unit (GPU) often used by US Navy and Air Force.
T62T-39
T66
A free power turbine version for the US military.

== Applications ==
Auxiliary Power Unit

- Boeing CH-46 Sea Knight
- Boeing CH-47 Chinook
- Sikorsky CH-54 Tarhe
- Lockheed Jetstar
- Pan American Falcon
- EMU30/E 60 KW Gas Turbine Engine Driven Gen Set

Turboshaft

- Alpi Syton AH 130
- Auroa Helicopters Auroa
- AvioTecnica ES-101 Raven
- Eagle Helicycle
- Famà Kiss 209
- Gyrodyne RON Rotorcycle
- Hillberg Turbine Exec
- LAE Ultrasport 496T
- Mosquito Aviation XE
- RotorWay Exec 162F (upgrades)
- Winner B150

Turboprop

- Bede BD-5

== Specifications ==
Data from Bennett

==== General characteristics ====
- Type: Turboshaft
- Length: 33.41 in (84.86 cm)
- Diameter: 21.375 in (54.293 cm)
- Dry weight: 142 lb (64 kg)

==== Components ====
- Compressor: Centrifugal Impeller
- Combustors: Annular reverse flow with six burners
- Turbine: Radial inflow impeller
- Fuel type: JP-4 / JP-5 / JP-8
- Oil system: Wet sump

==== Performance ====
- Maximum power output: 60 to 150 hp (45 to 112 kW)
- Power-to-weight ratio: 0.42 to 1.06 hp/lb (0.69 to 1.74 kW/kg)
