= RotorWay Exec =

American kit helicopter

Exec 162F
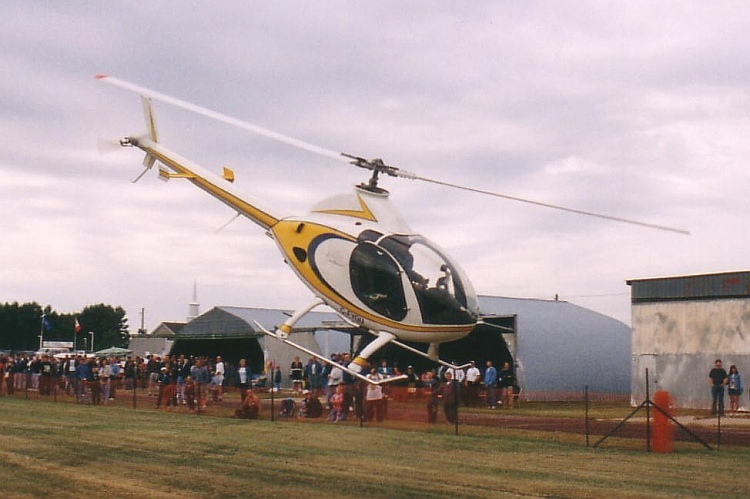

General information
- Type: Amateur-built helicopter
- Manufacturer: RotorWay International
- Status: Production completed

History
- Manufactured: 1994 - 2011
- Introduction date: 1994
- First flight: 1994
- Variants: Alpi Syton AH 130; RotorWay A600 Talon; Hillberg Turbine Exec

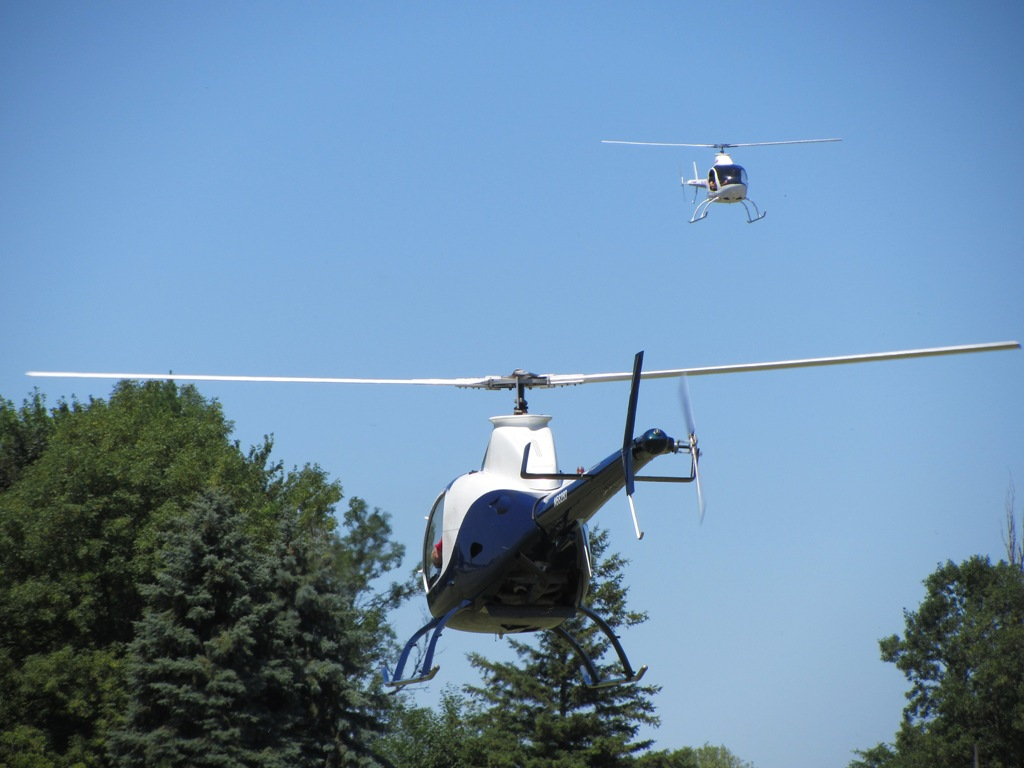
RotorWay Execs in flight

The RotorWay Exec is a family of American two-bladed, skid-equipped, two-seat kit helicopters, manufactured by RotorWay International of Chandler, Arizona and supplied in kit form for amateur-construction.

== Design and development ==
The Exec 162F is the latest in the Exec series of helicopters manufactured by RotorWay International.

The RotorWay Scorpion design was updated with an aluminum tail and full fiberglass cockpit enclosure to become the Exec. The Exec 90 was developed in the early 1990s, it was, at the time, the only piston-powered helicopter to utilize an asymmetrical airfoil for improved autorotation characteristics and safety.

In 1994, a fuel injection system with electronic ignition, and FADEC was added to the Exec 90, producing the Exec 162F.

Unlike most U.S.-designed helicopters, the main rotor on the Exec 162F rotates clockwise, as seen from above.

The Exec series was further developed into the RotorWay A600 Talon, which replaced the Exec in production.

== Operational history ==
Comedian and ventriloquist Jeff Dunham has a custom-painted Rotorway Exec 162F with his name and a picture of Walter on the aircraft.

== Variants ==
Rotorway Windstar
Four place development that was cancelled.
RotorWay Exec 90
Introduced in 1990, improvement of the original RotorWay Exec, Electronic ignition, eyebrow windows, elastomeric control head.
RotorWay Exec 162F
FADEC improved model.
AvioTecnica ES-101 Raven
In 1996 AvioTecnica of Italy marketed the Exec as the ES-101 Exec with a turbine engine instead of the piston engine. In 2004 it produced an improved variant it named the Aviotechnica ES-101 Raven powered by a modified Solar T-62-A turboshaft. Other improvements include carbon-fibre rotor blades, a two-piece windscreen and later models have a digital cockpit.
Alpi Syton AH 130
The Raven design was taken over by Alpi Aviation in late 2008 and the aircraft further developed into the Alpi Syton AH 130.
Hillberg Turbine Exec
A turbine conversion using the Solar T62 auxiliary power unit (APU) made by Hillberg Helicopters of Fountain Valley, California in the 1990s.

== Specifications ==
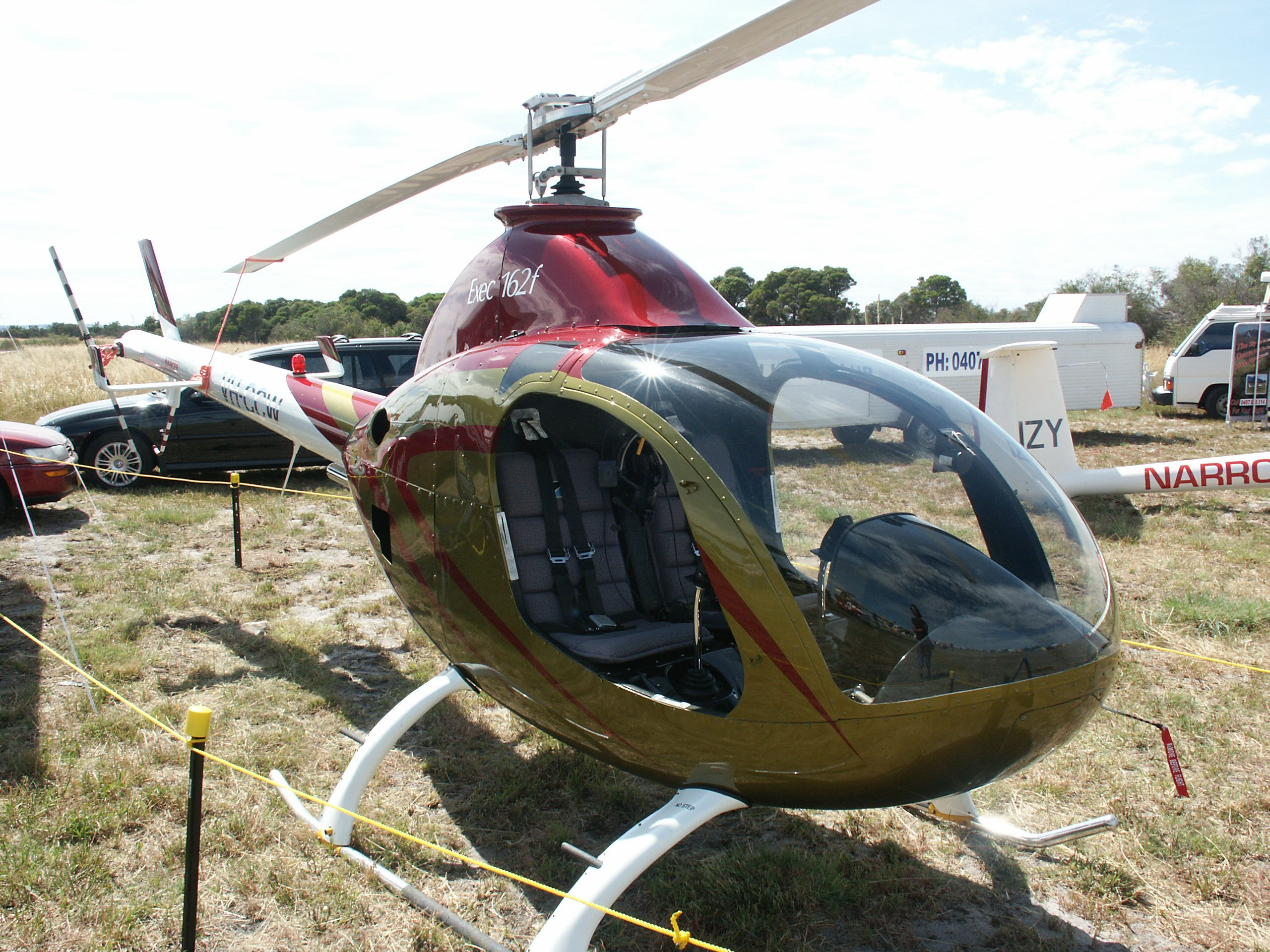
RotorWay Exec 162F

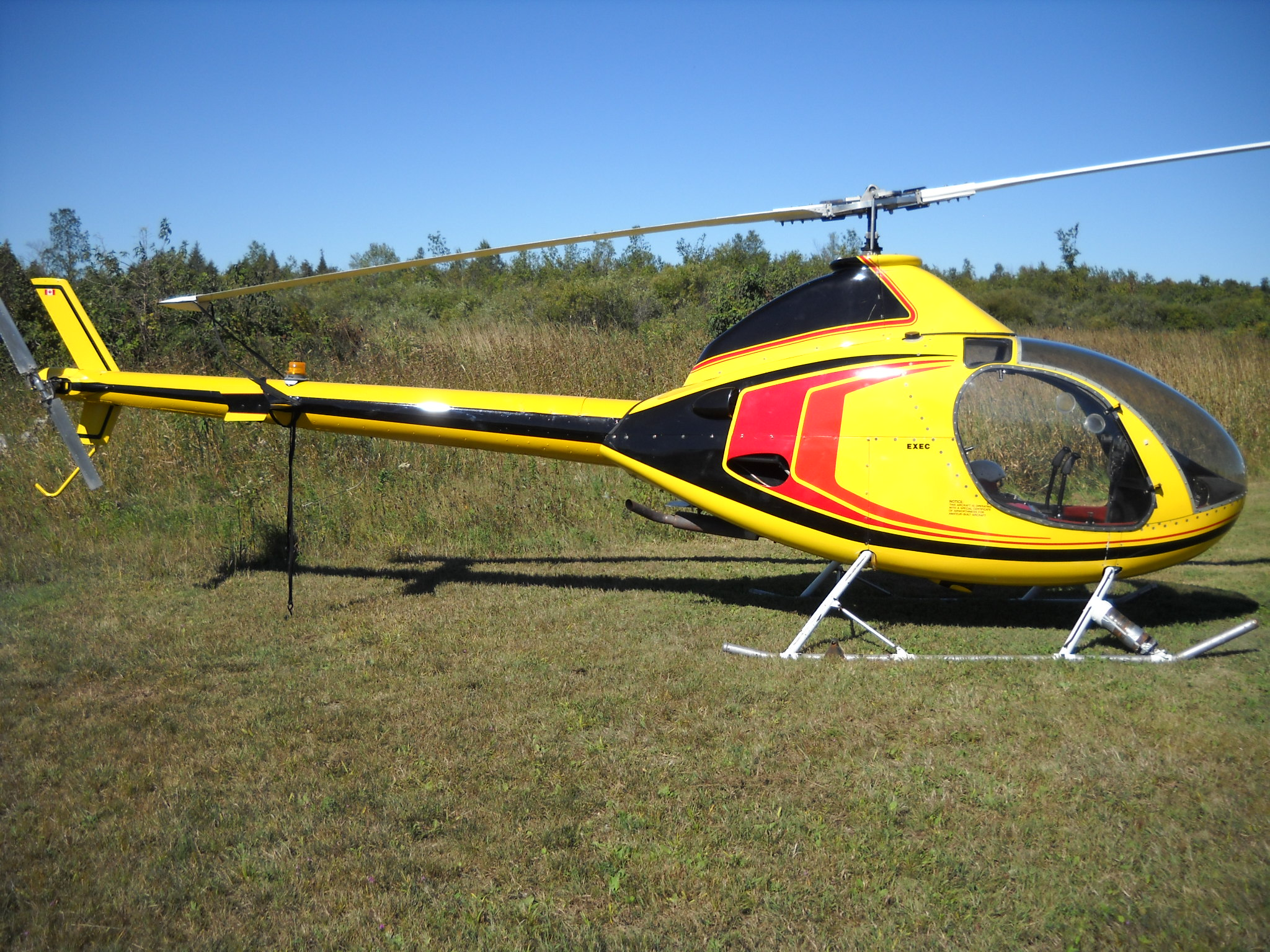
Rotorway Exec

Data from Brassey's World Aircraft & Systems Directory 1999/2000

General characteristics

- Crew: one
- Capacity: one passenger
- Length: 22 ft 0 in (6.71 m)
- Wingspan: 25 ft 0 in (7.62 m)
- Height: 8 ft 0 in (2.44 m)
- Wing area: 380 sq ft (35.4 m^{2})
- Empty weight: 975 lb (442 kg)
- Max takeoff weight: 1,500 lb (680 kg)
- Powerplant: 1 × RotorWay RI 162F flat-four piston engine, 150 hp (112 kW)

Performance

- Maximum speed: 115 mph (185 km/h, 100 kn) at sea level
- Cruise speed: 95 mph (153 km/h, 82 kn)
- Range: 180 mi (290 km, 156 nmi)
- Endurance: 2 hr with maximum fuel
- Service ceiling: 5,000 ft (1,525 m) hover ceiling, out of ground effect
- Rate of climb: 1,000 ft/min (5.1 m/s)

== See also ==
- Aerokopter AK1-3 Sanka
- Composite Helicopters International KC 518 Adventourer
