= Alpi Syton AH 130 =

Italian helicopter

Syton AH 130
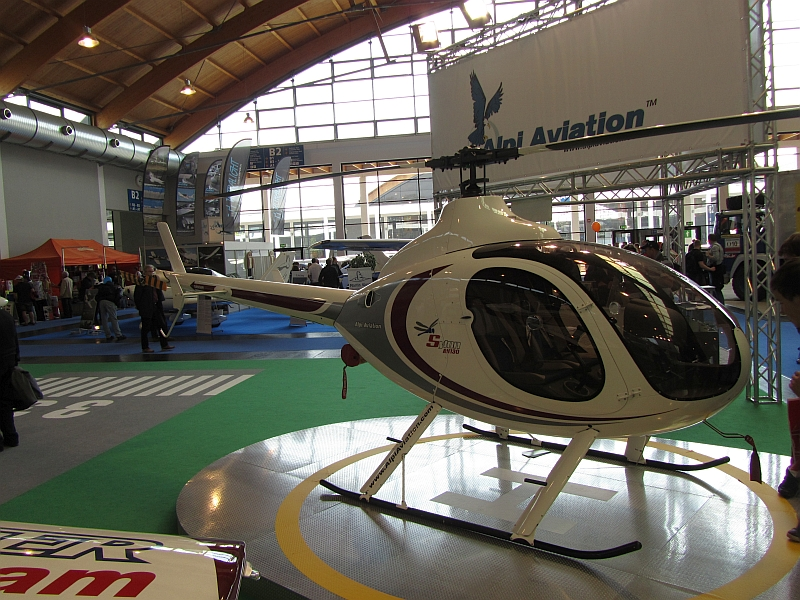

General information
- Type: Helicopter
- National origin: Italy
- Manufacturer: Alpi Aviation
- Status: In production (2013)

History
- Introduction date: 2008
- Developed from: RotorWay Exec and AvioTecnica ES-101 Raven

The Alpi Syton AH 130 is an Italian helicopter that was developed from the RotorWay Exec and is produced by Alpi Aviation of Pordenone.

== Design and development ==
The RotorWay Exec was developed into a turbine-powered version in 1996 by AvioTecnica of Italy and marketed as the AvioTecnica ES-101 Raven. In 2008 the Raven design was acquired by Alpi and further developed.

The AH 130 externally resembles the RotorWay Exec. It features a single main rotor, a two-seats-in side-by-side configuration enclosed cockpit, skid-type landing gear and a 130 hp (97 kW) Solar T62 auxiliary power unit employed as a turboshaft engine. Its 7.63 m (25.0 ft) diameter two-bladed rotor has a chord of 20 cm (7.9 in). The aircraft has an empty weight of 290 kg (639 lb) and a gross weight of 580 kg (1,279 lb), giving a useful load of 290 kg (639 lb). With full fuel of 90 litres (20 imp gal; 24 US gal) the payload is 225 kg (496 lb).

== Specifications ==
Data from Bayerl and Alpi Aviation

General characteristics

- Crew: one
- Capacity: one passenger
- Length: 8.84 m (29 ft 0 in)
- Width: 1.60 m (5 ft 3 in)
- Height: 2.40 m (7 ft 10 in)
- Empty weight: 290 kg (639 lb)
- Gross weight: 580 kg (1,279 lb)
- Fuel capacity: 90 litres (20 imp gal; 24 US gal)
- Powerplant: 1 × Solar T62 turboshaft, 97 kW (130 hp)
- Main rotor diameter: 7.63 m (25 ft 0 in)

Performance

- Maximum speed: 190 km/h (120 mph, 100 kn)
- Cruise speed: 185 km/h (115 mph, 100 kn)
- Never exceed speed: 210 km/h (130 mph, 110 kn)
- Range: 275 km (171 mi, 148 nmi)
- Service ceiling: 5,000 m (16,400 ft)
- Rate of climb: 8.5 m/s (1,670 ft/min)
