= Spitfire (disambiguation) =

The Supermarine Spitfire is a British single-seat fighter aircraft used in the Second World War.

Spitfire may also refer to:

== Transportation ==
=== Other aircraft ===
- Worldwide Ultralite Spitfire, ultralight aircraft
- Spitfire, the unofficial name for the Supermarine Type 224, which first flew in February 1934
- Spitfire Mark I, a helicopter
  - Spitfire Mark II Tigershark, a helicopter

=== Road ===
- Triumph Spitfire, a small two-seat British sports car from Triumph Motor Company developed in the 1960s
- BSA Spitfire, a British motorcycle launched in 1966

=== Rail ===
- Spitfire, a replacement name given to a GWR 4073 Class British steam railway locomotive 5071
- "Spitfire", name allocated to steam locomotive 34066 involved in the Lewisham rail disaster of December 1957

=== Ships and boats ===
- Spitfire (catamaran), a high-performance catamaran
- Botafogo (galleon), Spitfire in Portuguese, at the time the largest ship ever built
- HMCS Spitfire, a 1855 Australian gunboat
- HMS Spitfire, the name of 10 Royal Navy ships, and one proposed one
- SS Spitfire, several ships
- USS Spitfire, the name of six U.S. Navy ships
- A type of jib sail

== Comics ==
- Spitfire (character), a fictional character in Marvel Comics World War II-era superteam "The Invaders"
- Spitfire (New Universe), a.k.a. Spitfire and the Troubleshooters and Codename: Spitfire, a comic book published under the New Universe imprint of Marvel Comics
- Project Spitfire, a fictional U.S. government project appearing in the Marvel Comics' series newuniversal
- Spitfire, a character from the anime/manga Air Gear

== Films ==
- The Spitfire (1914 film), an American comedy film
- Spitfire (1922 film), an American film produced by REOL Productions
- The Spitfire (1924 film), a lost silent film
- Spitfire (1934 film), a U.S. film starring Katharine Hepburn
- Spitfire (1942 film), the U.S. title of the 1942 British film The First of the Few
- Spitfire, a 1995 U.S. film starring Lance Henriksen
- Spitfire (2018 film), a British documentary film

== Music ==
- Spitfire (American band), a metalcore band from Virginia Beach, Virginia
- Spitfire (English band), a garage rock band from Crawley, West Sussex, England
- Spitfire (Russian band), a ska band from Saint Petersburg, Russia
- The Spitfire Band, a Canadian big band
- Spitfire Prelude and Fugue, an orchestral composition by William Walton, arranged and extracted from music for 1942 film
- Spitfire (Jefferson Starship album), 1976
- Spitfire (EP), a 2011 EP by Porter Robinson
  - "Spitfire", the EP's title track
- Spitfire (LeAnn Rimes album), 2013
- "Spitfire" (song), a 2004 single by the British electronic dance music group The Prodigy
- "Spitfire", a track by Public Service Broadcasting from their 2012 EP The War Room and 2013 album Inform - Educate - Entertain
- "Spitfire", a 2017 single by the Israeli musical duo Infected Mushroom
- "Spitfire", a 2008 single by the Italian Eurobeat duo Go 2, featured in the anime MF Ghost
- Spitfire Audio, creators of digital sample libraries
- Spitfire Records, a heavy metal-oriented record label

== Science and technology ==
- Spitfire (BBS), a software program for operating a Bulletin Board System
- Spitfire sawfly, a type of insect and its caterpillar found in Australia

== Sport clubs ==
- Kent Spitfires, the name adopted by Kent County Cricket Club when playing One Day or Twenty20 matches
- London Spitfire, an esports team in the Overwatch League
- Windsor Spitfires, a junior ice hockey team in the Ontario Hockey League
- Eastleigh F.C., a non-league football club in Hampshire, England, nicknamed "The Spitfires"

== Other uses ==
- Spitfire, a professional wrestling tag team consisting of Dani Luna and Jody Threat
- Spitfire (beer), a UK bottled and cask beer
- Spitfire Aerodrome, an airport in Pedricktown, New Jersey, US
- .22 Spitfire (5.7 x 33 mm), rifle cartridge
- Spitfire, a former name of the video game Serious Sam: Tormental
- A fire element Skylander from Skylanders: SuperChargers
- A character from My Little Pony: Friendship Is Magic
- The M600 Spitfire, a weapon from Titanfall and Apex Legends
- Spitfire Wheels, a San Francisco-based skateboarding equipment manufacturer
- Videocart-4: Spitfire, a 1977 video game for the Fairchild Channel F

== See also ==
- Kent Spitfire (disambiguation)
