= Menominee–Marinette Twin County Airport =

Public aerodrome in Michigan, US

Menominee Regional Airport
- IATA: MNM; ICAO: KMNM; FAA LID: MNM

Summary
- Airport type: Public
- Owner: Menominee County
- Serves: Cities of Menominee, Michigan and Marinette, Wisconsin
- Location: Menominee, Michigan
- Elevation AMSL: 625 ft / 191 m
- Coordinates: 45°07′36″N 087°38′18″W

Map
- Location of airport in Michigan MNM (the United States)

Runways
Direction	Length		Surface
Direction	ft	m	Surface
3/21	5,999	1,828	Asphalt
14/32	5,101	1,555	Asphalt

Statistics (2022)
- Aircraft operations: 8,050
- Based aircraft: 38
- Source: Federal Aviation Administration

Menominee Regional Airport (IATA: MNM, ICAO: KMNM, FAA LID: MNM) is a public use airport located 1 mile (2 km) northwest of the central business district of Menominee, Michigan, a city in Menominee County, Michigan, United States. It is included in the Federal Aviation Administration (FAA) National Plan of Integrated Airport Systems for 2021–2025, in which it is categorized as a local general aviation facility.

The airport received $30,000 from the U.S. Department of Transportation in 2020 as part of the CARES Act to help mitigate the effects of the COVID-19 pandemic.

== Historical commercial service ==
Up until 1979, roughly contemporaneous with airline deregulation, regional carrier North Central Airlines provided commercial air passenger service to Twin County Airport. Service was available to the following destinations (not all destinations were available at the same period): Escanaba, MI: Delta County Airport; Green Bay, WI: Green Bay–Austin Straubel International Airport; Milwaukee, WI: Milwaukee Mitchell International Airport; and Chicago, IL: O'Hare International Airport. Republic Airlines (successor to North Central) continued limited service to Twin County Airport until 1981, with direct flights available to Milwaukee, WI.

== Facilities and aircraft ==
Menominee Regional Airport covers an area of 760 acres (308 ha) at an elevation of 625 feet (191 m) above mean sea level. It has two runways: 3/21 is 5,999 by 100 feet (1,828 x 30 m) with an asphalt surface; and 14/32 is 5,101 by 100 feet (1,555 x 30 m) with an asphalt surface. Both runways have approved GPS approaches.

The airport has a fixed-base operator that offers a lounge, restrooms, courtesy transportation, snooze rooms, a conference room, and fuel.

For the 12-month period ending December 31, 2022, the airport had 8,050 aircraft operations, an average of 22 per day: 92% general aviation and 8% air taxi.

In December 2022, there were 38 aircraft based at this airport: 27 single-engine, 5 multi-engine airplanes, and 6 helicopters.

== Accidents and incidents ==
- On November 26, 2003, an American Champion 7GCBC collided with terrain while attempting to land at the Menominee–Marinette Twin County Airport. The pilot reported a slight bump while on the takeoff roll, but he disregarded it and continued the flight. Upon returning to land, the left main tire struck an object, and there was a bang as if something had struck the fuselage. The airplane pulled left and the pilot used right rudder to correct, but the airplane veered to the right with the right wing contacting the ground. The airplane skidded sideways for about 150 feet coming to rest off the departure end of runway 32. A Phillips screwdriver was later found on the runway 32 near the point of takeoff. The probable cause was found to be the Phillips screwdriver impacting the left tire on takeoff roll, and the deflated tire which did not allow directional control to be maintained during the subsequent landing.
- On December 5, 2006, a Cessna 425 impacted a building while parking at the airport. After pulling into a parking space, the pilot set the parking brake, moved the throttles to flight idle, and feathered the propellers. As the propellers feathered, the aircraft began to taxi forward, and the pilot put the propeller levers full forward and put the throttles back into Beta. The aircraft continued rolling, so the pilot moved the mixture control to the cutoff position, but the airplane struck a building instead. The probable cause was found to be the pilot's failure to maintain control of the aircraft while parking the aircraft, and his failure to maintain clearance from the building as the airplane taxied forward.
- On August 29, 2011, an Enstrom F-28F was damaged during a test flight at Menominee–Marinette Twin County Airport. The pilot reported the controls were heavy but the aircraft was controllable. During his attempt to position a force gauge between his hand and the collective grip, the pilot lost control of the helicopter and it landed hard onto the ramp. The helicopter's tail rotor blades impacted the ramp and the helicopter came to rest upright. The probable cause was found to be the pilot's failure to maintain control of the helicopter during a hover.
- On February 12, 2016, an Enstrom TH-180 helicopter was substantially damaged after it impacted obstructions and terrain during an off-airport emergency landing while on approach to Menominee–Marinette Twin County Airport. On final, the pilot felt the aircraft jolt before yawing left and entering a descent. The pilot added throttle, which increased engine rpm but had no effect on the rotor rpm. The low rotor rpm horn sounded, and the pilot entered an autorotation to a city street in a residential neighborhood. During touchdown the main rotor blades struck an electric utility pole as the helicopter slid about 300 feet down the street and came to rest upright. A postaccident examination of the helicopter revealed the 8 mounting bolts for the engine torque meter had sheared separating the engine from the main belt drive system. The probable cause was found to be the failure of the torque meter mounting bolts, which resulted in a loss of engine power to the main drive belt and rotors.

== See also ==
- List of airports in Michigan
- List of airports in Michigan's Upper Peninsula
- Enstrom Helicopter Corporation
