= List of equipment of Bolivarian Military Aviation =

This article provides a list of Venezuelan (Bolivarian) military aircraft currently in service or on order with the Bolivarian Military Aviation, previously called the Venezuelan Air Force.

== Current inventory ==
Aircraft	Origin	Type	Variant	In service	Notes
Combat aircraft
Sukhoi Su-30	Russia	Multirole fighter	Su-30MKV	21	In poor condition. 13 may be serviceable. Armed with Kh-31 anti-ship missiles.
General Dynamics F-16 Fighting Falcon	United States	Air-superiority fighter	F-16A/B	18	3 may be serviceable.
Electronic-warfare
Metroliner IV	United States	EW / reconnaissance		1	
Tanker
Boeing 707	United States	aerial refueling		1	
Transport
Cessna Citation II	United States	VIP		1	
King Air	United States	utility	200/350	6	
Short 360	United Kingdom	utility transport		2	
Cessna 208	United States	light utility		4	
Shaanxi Y-8	China	transport		8	
Metroliner IV	United States	light utility		1	
C-130 Hercules	United States	transport	C-130H	4	
Dornier 228	Germany	transport	Dornier 228NG	3	
Helicopters
Mil Mi-17	Russia	utility	Mi-8/17	6	
Eurocopter AS532	France	transport		10	
Mil Mi-28	Russia	attack			10 on order
Trainer aircraft
Hongdu JL-8	China/Pakistan	jet trainer	K-8W	18	
Diamond DA42	Austria	multi-engine trainer		6	
Embraer EMB 312	Brazil	trainer		5-8	
SIAI-Marchetti SF.260	Italy	basic trainer		5	
Enstrom 280	United States	rotorcraft trainer		2	
Enstrom 480	United States	rotorcraft trainer		12	4 on order
UAV
Arpía 1	Venezuela	Surveillance	12		Based on Ghods Mohajer-2 technology transferred by Iran. First drone manufactured in Venezuela.
STC Orlan-10	Russia	Reconnaissance			
Qods Mohajer-6	Iran	Reconnaissance and spotting			Armed with Qaem air-to-ground munition.
Antonio José de Sucre-100	Venezuela	Light reconnaissance and strike			Armed with Russian munitions.
Antonio José de Sucre-200	Venezuela	Stealthy multi-role			Developed with Iranian assistance.
Zamora V-1	Venezuela	Loitering munition			Based on HESA Shahed 136 technology transferred by Iran.
