= Spitfire Mk.II =

Spitfire Mk.II may refer to:

- Supermarine Spitfire Mk.II
- Spitfire Helicopters Spitfire Mk.II
- JSL (Hereford) Ltd Spitfire Mk 2 pistol
