= Enstrom TH180 =

American two-place helicopter

TH180
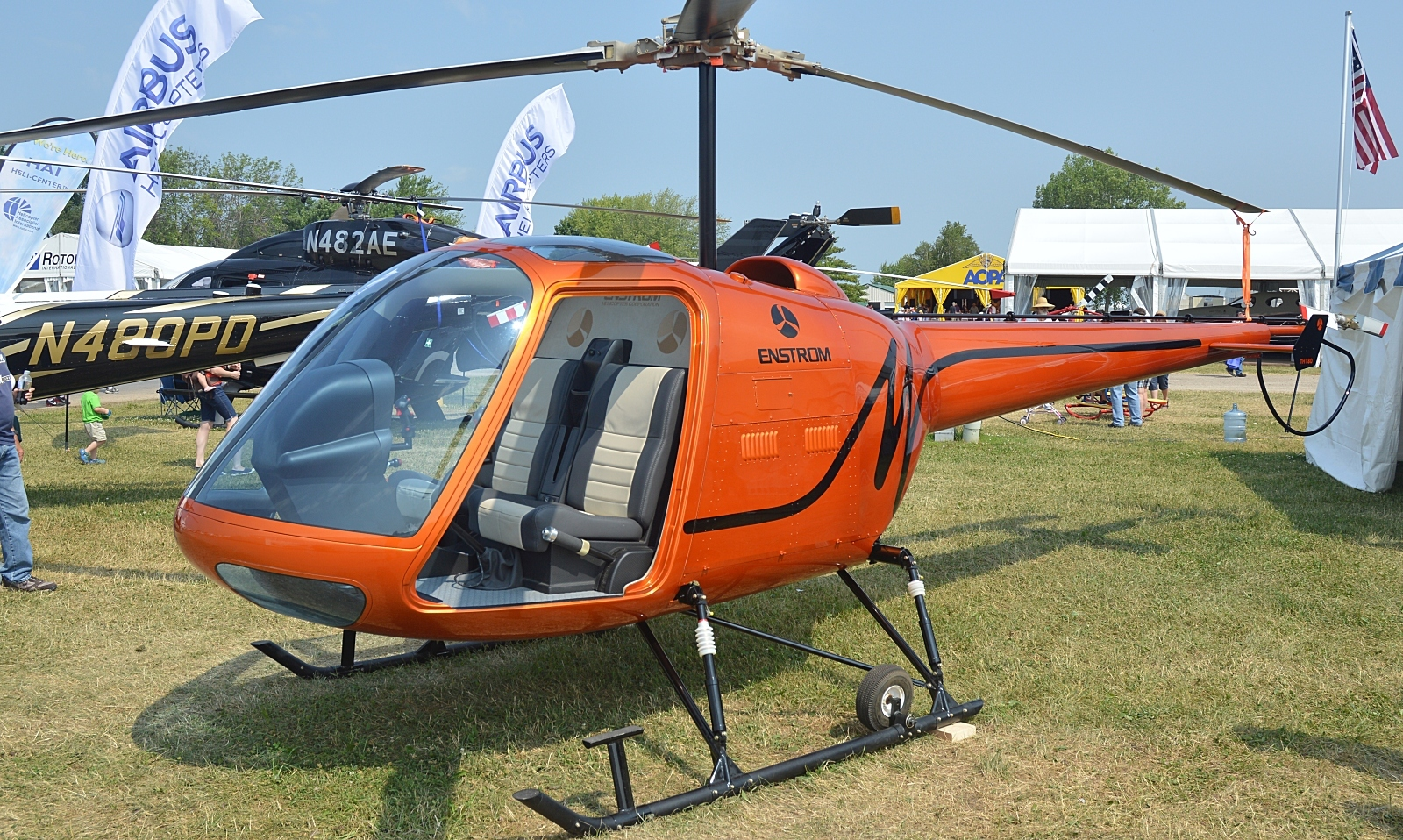

General information
- Type: Helicopter
- Manufacturer: Enstrom Helicopter Corporation
- Status: Cancelled

History
- First flight: 6 February 2015
- Developed from: Enstrom F-28F

The Enstrom TH180 is a single piston-engined two-place training helicopter manufactured by Enstrom in the United States.

== Development ==
The TH180 has a three-bladed main rotor blades and landing gear enhanced from the standard F280 model.

== Specifications (TH180) ==
Data from AOPA

General characteristics

- Crew: 2
- Gross weight: 2,250 lb (1,021 kg)
- Fuel capacity: 40
- Powerplant: 1 × Lycoming HIO-390 horizontally-opposed air-cooled piston engine, 210 hp (160 kW)

Performance

== See also ==
Related development

- Enstrom F-28
- Enstrom 480
- Spitfire Mark I

Aircraft of comparable role, configuration, and era

- Brantly B-2
- Robinson R22
- Robinson R44
- Schweizer 300C
