= Chongqing Helicopter Investment Corporation =

Chinese helicopter manufacturer

- Headquarters: Chongqing, China
- Subsidiaries: Enstrom Helicopter Corporation

Chongqing Helicopter Investment Corporation
- Simplified Chinese: 重庆直升机产业投资有限公司
- Traditional Chinese: 重慶直升機產業投資有限公司
- Literal meaning: Chongqing Helicopter Industry Investment Limited Company
Transcriptions
Standard Mandarin
- Hanyu Pinyin: Chóngqìng Zhíshēngjī Chányè Tóuzī Yǒuxiàn Gōngsī

Chongqing Helicopter Investment Corporation is a Chinese aircraft manufacturer based in Chongqing, specializing in helicopters.

In 2011, the company announced that it would be working with AgustaWestland on future projects.

It acquired Enstrom Helicopter Corporation in December 2012, with production facilities in Menominee, Michigan, United States. The company filed for Chapter 7 and ceased operations in January 2022.

Its assets were later acquired by Surack Enterprises in May of the same year.
