= Spitfire Mk.I =

Spitfire Mk.I may refer to:

- Supermarine Spitfire Mk.I
- Spitfire Helicopters Spitfire Mk.I
