= Kent Spitfire =

Kent Spitfire may refer to:

- Spitfire (beer), a Kentish ale
- Kent County Cricket Club, also known as the Kent Spitfires

== See also ==
- Spitfire (disambiguation)
