= Sweetwater Sound =

American musical instrument retailer

- Trade name: Sweetwater
- Type: Private
- Industry: Musical Instruments, Pro Audio, Lighting
- Founded: 1979; 47 years ago
- Founder: Chuck Surack
- Headquarters: Fort Wayne, Indiana, US
- Key people: Chuck Surack (chairman of the board); Mike Clem (president and CEO)
- Products: Musical Instruments, Pro Audio, Lighting, and accessories
- Revenue: $1.86 Billion (2025)
- Owner: Providence Equity (2021-present)
- Number of employees: 2,500
- Website: www.sweetwater.com

Sweetwater is an American musical instrument retailer. Based in Fort Wayne, Indiana, Sweetwater is the largest online retailer of musical instruments and pro audio equipment in the United States.

== History ==
Chuck Surack established the company in 1979 in Fort Wayne, Indiana, so that he could stop being a touring musician. The company originally offered recording services via a remote recording studio in Surack's Volkswagen microbus and a recording studio based out of his home. In 1985, to increase the services the recording studio could offer, Surack bought a Kurzweil K250, and became known for his custom K250 sound library and programming skills as well as his upgrade kits.

Sweetwater became a Kurzweil dealer, but the company's clients were asking for advice regarding other products as well, so Surack expanded Sweetwater to become a retailer of musical instruments and pro audio equipment, with the recording studio continuing as an integral part of the business. In 1990, with six employees and annual sales of $6 million, Sweetwater had outgrown Surack's home and moved into its own commercial building at 5335 Bass Road, and Sweetwater's growth over the next several years earned it a place on Inc. magazine's ranking of America's fastest growing companies in 1993, 1994, and 1995.

In 1995, the company launched Sweetwater.com as an informational site, but by 1999 the site offered most of Sweetwater's inventory for purchase online. Electronic Musician included sweetwater.com as one of nine essential online information resources for a musician. In addition to its website, Sweetwater has several publications, including the ProGear Directory, Worship Sound Pro, and Music Educators Technology Resource., and a blog, inSync.

In 2006, with 220 employees and continued business growth, Sweetwater commissioned MSKTD & Associates to design and master plan a new 44-acre corporate campus at 5501 US Highway 30 W in Fort Wayne, with corporate offices, a distribution center with warehouse, a retail store, and Sweetwater Studios recording studio complex and 250-seat LARES-equipped performance theater, both designed by Russ Berger Design Group. Sweetwater's new facility was certified LEED Platinum by the U.S. Green Building Council in April, 2009.

In January 2011, Surack acquired the assets of Pensacola, Florida-based audio/video systems integrator All Pro Sound, eventually merging the company, still based at its Pensacola headquarters and since rebranded as All Pro Integrated Systems, into Sweetwater.

In 2015, Surack purchased Mynett Music Company, a retail music store established in Fort Wayne in 1933, focused on providing music instruments, lessons, and repair services for students and school music programs.

In October 2018, Sweetwater announced another expansion to construct a new warehousing facility. Completed in early 2020, the 480,000-square foot distribution center facilitates product storage and customer order fulfillment, as well as product testing, product photography, offices, staff amenities, and more, while more than doubling the shipping capacity of the Sweetwater's previous warehouse.

In July 2021, Sweetwater opened a new retail store. The 44,000 square foot store more than tripled the size of the previous retail store location it replaced, which also made it possible for Sweetwater to include Mynett Music's products and services within the new Sweetwater store. Later the same year, Sweetwater began selling band and orchestra instruments and accessories.

In August 2021, it was announced that Rhode Island private equity firm Providence Equity had purchased a majority share of Sweetwater, and Surack had stepped down as CEO.

== Campus ==
Sweetwater's Fort Wayne campus includes its corporate offices and distribution center, along with Sweetwater Studios recording studios, two performance venues, a music academy, a retail store, and numerous customer and employee amenities.

== Sweetwater Studios ==
Upon completion of Sweetwater's new corporate campus in late 2007, Sweetwater Studios moved into a new 3-room recording facility and performance theater designed by Russ Berger Design Group. In 2014, Sweetwater Studios upgraded Studio A to a hybrid recording system consisting of 36 channels of Rupert Neve Designs Shelford modules and analog summing master section, combined with Avid S6 control surface, interfaces, and Pro Tools, and over 80 channels of outboard analog processing from API, Solid State Logic, Universal Audio, Focusrite, Shadow Hills, Millennia, A-Designs, Daking, Drawmer, Chandler, Manley Laboratories and Dangerous Music. In 2022, Studio B was upgraded to a Dolby Atmos-capable mixing and mastering room.

Sweetwater Studios offers a roster of in-house session musicians, including guitarist Don Carr, drummer and vocalist Nick D'Virgilio, bassist Dave Martin, and keyboardist Phil Naish, and offers recording, mixing, and mastering services, along with education and training for customers and employees.

Notable artists who have had projects produced at Sweetwater Studios include: Adrian Belew, Jonatha Brooke, Steven Curtis Chapman, Counting Crows, Peter Erskine & the Dr. Um Band, Beth Hart, Russ Taff, and Carl Verheyen.

== Philanthropy ==
Sweetwater contributes to more than 600 nonprofit organizations annually, including charitable donations to Fort Wayne Community Schools, Arts United of Fort Wayne, the Fort Wayne Philharmonic Orchestra, Easter Seals ARC of Northeast Indiana, and the Voices of Unity Youth Choir.

=== Majic Miracle Music ===
From 2006 to 2013, Sweetwater Studios and local Fort Wayne radio station WAJI Majic 95.1 partnered to record live, acoustic music from nationally recognized artists and bands traveling through Fort Wayne. These recordings and others were compiled to produce "Majic Miracle Music" charity CDs to benefit Riley Hospital for Children at Indiana University Health. Artists who recorded at Sweetwater Productions for "Majic Miracle Music" CDs include REO Speedwagon, Ingrid Michaelson, Lenka, Aimee Allen, Jars of Clay, Landon Pigg, Ben Jelen, Josh Kelley, Sara Bareilles, Jon McLaughlin, Gin Blossoms, and Collective Soul.

== Reception ==
Music Inc. named Sweetwater "Retailer of the Year" in 2012 and again in 2020. In 2023, Sweetwater was included on Newsweek's list of America's Greatest Workplaces for Diversity.
