= Northrop Grumman MQ-8 Fire Scout =

2000s American unmanned autonomous helicopter developed by Northrop Grumman

MQ-8 Fire Scout
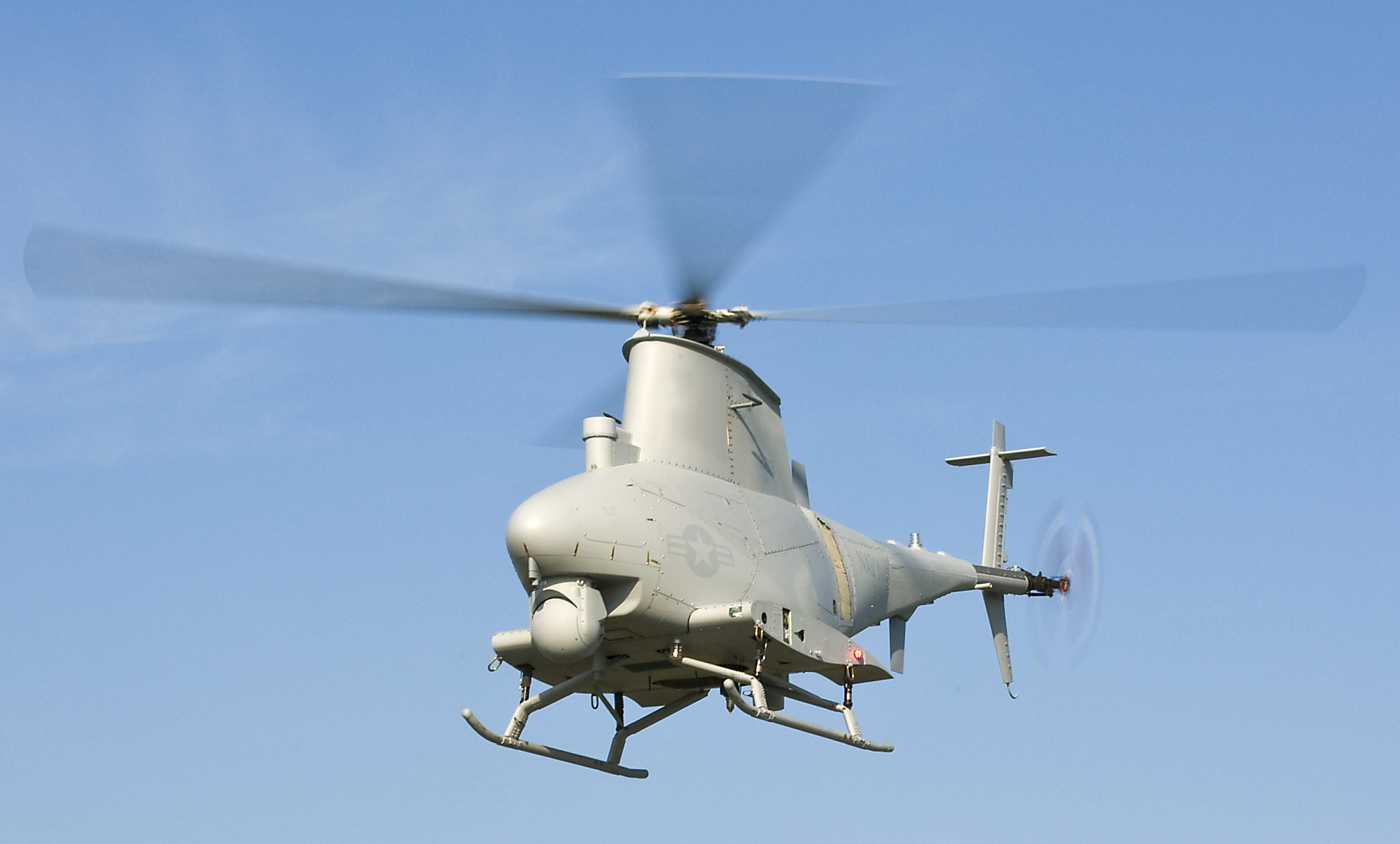
- An MQ-8B Fire Scout completes first biofuel flight at Webster Field, September 2011

General information
- Type: UAV helicopter
- Manufacturer: Northrop Grumman
- Status: Retired (RQ-8A, MQ-8B)
- Primary user: United States Navy
- Number built: 30 (MQ-8B)

History
- Introduction date: 2009 (MQ-8B)
- First flight: 2000
- Retired: 2022
- Developed from: Schweizer 330 and 333
- Variant: Sikorsky S-434
- Developed into: Northrop Grumman MQ-8C Fire Scout

The Northrop Grumman MQ-8 Fire Scout is an unmanned autonomous helicopter developed by Northrop Grumman for use by the United States Armed Forces. The Fire Scout is designed to provide reconnaissance, situational awareness, aerial fire support and precision targeting support for ground, air and sea forces. The initial RQ-8A version was based on the Schweizer 330, while the enhanced MQ-8B was derived from the Schweizer 333. The larger MQ-8C Fire Scout variant is based on the Bell 407.

In February 2018, 23 MQ-8Bs were in service with the U.S. Navy. The MQ-8B was retired from service in October 2022.

== Design and development ==
=== RQ-8A ===
As the US Navy was withdrawing its RQ-2 Pioneers from service, it began to seek a second generation UAV. The Navy requirement specified a vertical takeoff & landing (VTOL) aircraft, with a payload capacity of 90 kg (200 lb), a range of 125 miles (200 km), an endurance on station of three hours at an altitude of 20,000 feet (6,100 m), and the ability to land on a ship in a 29 mph (47 km/h; 13 m/s) wind. The UAV was to fly 190 hours before planned maintenance.

There were three finalists in the competition, which was designated "VTOL-UAV" or "VTUAV". Bell, Sikorsky, and a collaboration of Teledyne Ryan and Schweizer Aircraft submitted designs. The Ryan-Schweizer UAV was selected as the winner in the spring of 2000. The RQ-8A Fire Scout, as it was named, was a derivative of the Schweizer three-passenger, turbine powered 330SP helicopter, with a new fuselage, new fuel system, and UAV electronics and sensors.

The initial prototype of the Fire Scout was piloted in initial tests, flying autonomously for the first time in January 2000. The Rolls-Royce 250-C20 turbine engine ran on JP-8 and JP-5 jet fuel (the latter of which has a higher flashpoint and is considered safe for shipboard storage and use).

The Fire Scout was to be fitted with a sensor ball turret that carries electro-optic and infrared cameras, and a laser range finder. It was to be controlled over a data link derived from the Northrop Grumman RQ-4 Global Hawk UAV, operating over a line of sight to a distance of 172 miles (280 km). The control system was to be fitted onto a ship, or could be carried on a Humvee light vehicle for US Marine service.

=== MQ-8B ===
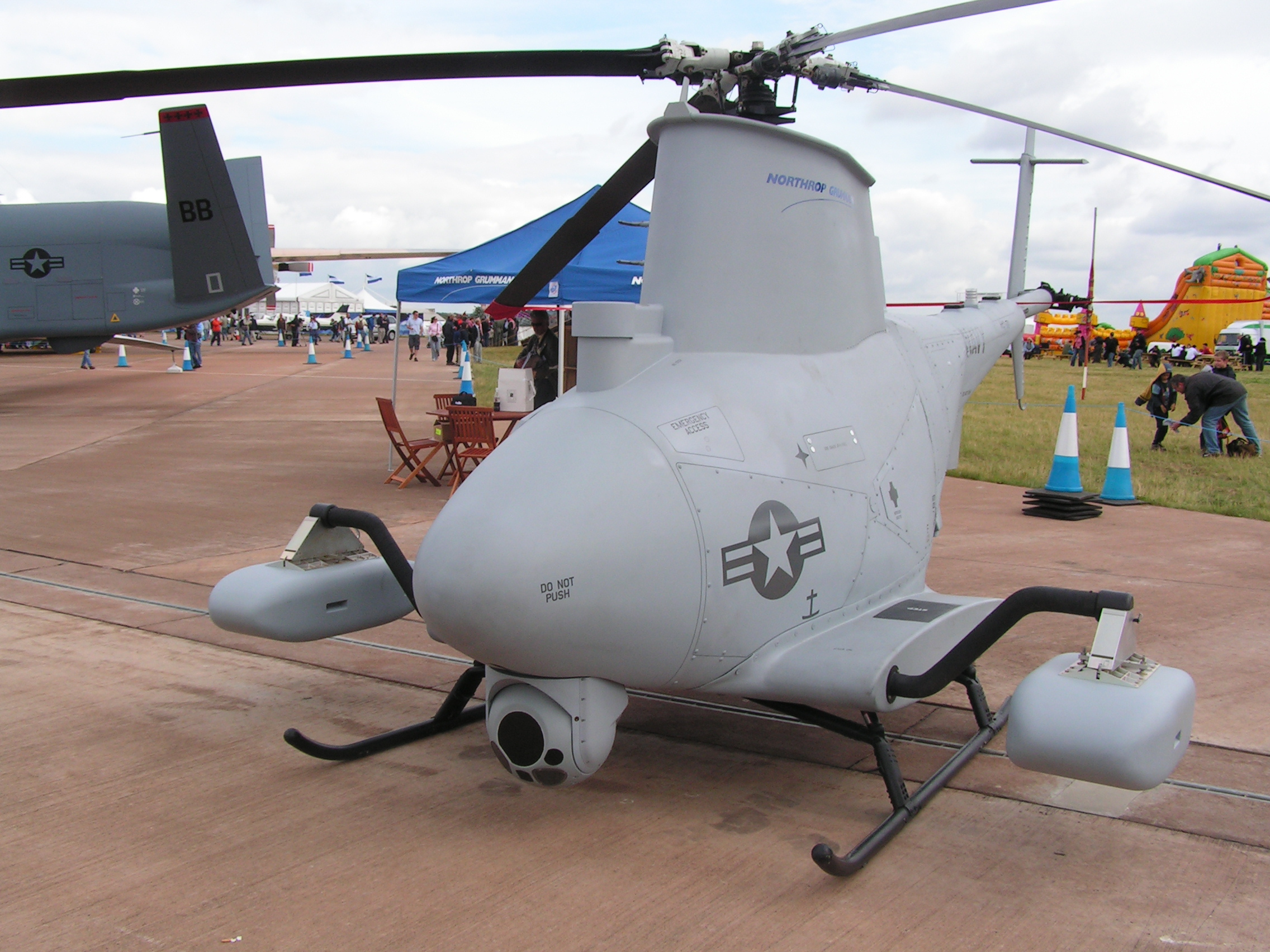
An MQ-8B Fire Scout displayed at the Royal International Air Tattoo, RAF Fairford, Gloucestershire, England, July 2007

Although progress on the project had been regarded as satisfactory, the Navy decided the Fire Scout didn't meet their needs after all, and cut funding for production in December 2001. However, the development program continued, and Northrop Grumman pitched a range of improved configurations to anyone who was interested. As it turned out, the U.S. Army was very interested, awarding a contract for seven improved RQ-8B evaluation machines in late 2003. In 2006, it was redesignated MQ-8B.

The MQ-8B features a four-blade main rotor, in contrast to the larger-diameter three-blade rotor of the RQ-8A, to reduce noise and improve lift capacity and performance. The four-blade rotor had already been evaluated on Fire Scout prototypes. They increase gross takeoff weight by 500 pounds (230 kg), to 3,150 pounds (1,430 kg) with payloads of up to 700 pounds (320 kg) for short-range missions. The MQ-8B is 23.95 feet (7.30 m) long, 6.2 feet (1.9 m) wide, and 9.71 feet (2.96 m) tall.

The MQ-8B is fitted with stub wings which serve both an aerodynamic purpose as well as an armament carriage location. Weapons to be carried include Hellfire missiles, Viper Strike laser-guided glide weapons, and, in particular, pods carrying the Advanced Precision Kill Weapon System (APKWS), a laser-guided 70 mm (2.75 in) folding-fin rocket, which the Army saw as ideal for the modern battlefield. The Army was also interested in using the Fire Scout to carry up to 200 pounds (91 kg) of emergency supplies to troops in the field.

The MQ-8B is being modified to permit rapid swap out of payload configurations. The current sensor configuration of a day/night turret with a laser target designator will remain an option. Alternate sensor payloads in consideration include a TSAR with Moving Target Indicator (MTI) capability, a multispectral sensor, a SIGINT module, the Target Acquisition Minefield Detection System (ASTAMIDS), and the Tactical Common Data Link (TCDL). The Army wanted the Fire Scout to operate as an element of an integrated ground sensor network as well.

In April 2006, production on the flight test airframes was initiated at Northrop Grumman's Unmanned Systems production plant in Moss Point, Mississippi. The first flight of the MQ-8B took place on 18 December 2006 at Naval Air Station Patuxent River. The Army interest revived Navy interest in the program, with the Navy ordering eight Sea Scout MQ-8B derivatives for evaluation. In January 2010, the Army terminated its involvement with the Fire Scout, contending that the RQ-7 Shadow UAV could meet the Army's needs. In 2009, the Navy approved low-rate initial production.

The MQ-8B complements the manned aviation detachments onboard Air Capable ships and is deployed along with a MH-60R HSM detachment or a MH-60S HSC detachment. With the planned addition of radar, AIS, and weapons, the MQ-8B shall have many capabilities of the manned MH-60R. It will give air detachments greater flexibility in meeting mission demands, and will free manned aircraft.

On 23 September 2011, Naval Air Systems Command awarded Northrop Grumman a $17 million contract to outfit the MQ-8B with the Advanced Precision Kill Weapon System laser-guided 70 mm rocket. By August 2013, the MQ-8B had completed 11 of 12 APKWS launches, with testing to be completed "shortly." By February 2016, the APKWS had been fielded on the MQ-8B. Due to its limited payload, the MQ-8B carries three tube rocket launchers.

On 30 December 2012, the Navy issued an urgent order to install RDR-1700 maritime surveillance radars on nine MQ-8Bs. The RDR-1700 is an X-band synthetic aperture radar housed in a modified radome mounted on the helicopter's underside for 360-degree coverage, interfaced with the UAV and its control station. Detailed range is out to 25 km (16 mi), with a max range of 80 km (50 mi). The RDR-1700 can see through clouds and sandstorms and can perform terrain mapping or weather detection, and track 20 air or surface targets, determining a target's range, bearing, and velocity. In January 2013, the Navy awarded a $33 million contract to Telephonics for the RDR-1700B+ radar, designated AN/ZPY-4(V)1. The radar gives a beyond the horizon broad area search and track capability to track up to 200 targets and operates in surface search, terrain mapping, emergency beacon detection, and weather avoidance modes, supplementing the FLIR Systems Brite Star II electro-optical/infrared payload. It was first demonstrated on an MQ-8B on 7 May 2014.

In 2017, the MQ-8B was to receive a mine-detection sensor for use in littoral waters called the Coastal Battlefield Reconnaissance and Analysis (COBRA). The COBRA is designed to detect naval mines at a safe distance from a Littoral Combat Ship operating in coastal waters, and also has the capability to locate submarines through acoustic detection if they are on or near the surface. COBRA takes the place of the Fire Scout's usual EO/IR sensor.

== Operational history ==
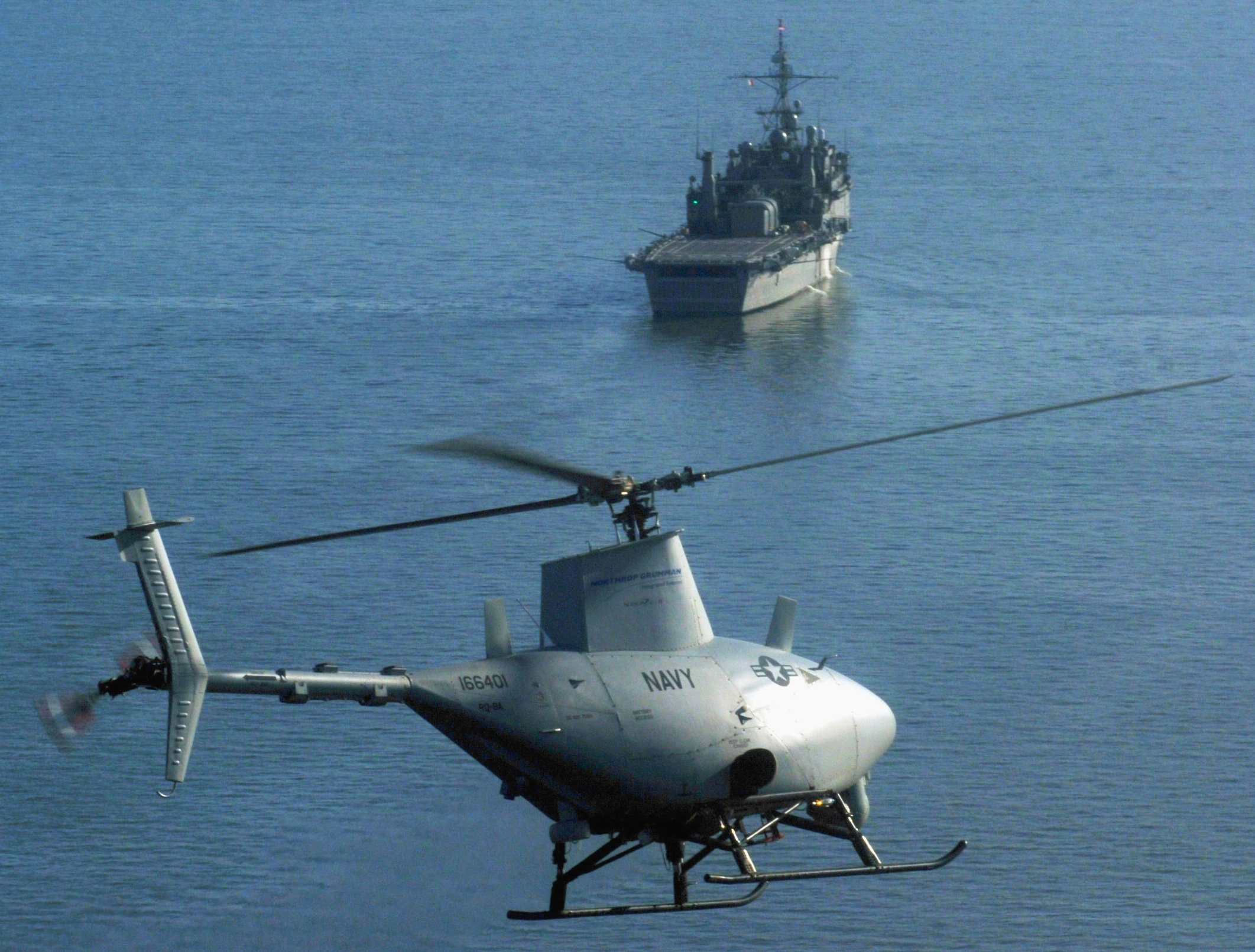
An RQ-8A prepares for the first autonomous landing aboard USS Nashville during sea trials, 2006.

In January 2006, an RQ-8A Fire Scout landed aboard the amphibious transport ship Nashville while it was steaming off the coast of Maryland near the Patuxent River. This marked the first time an unmanned helicopter has landed autonomously aboard a moving U.S. Navy ship without a pilot controlling the aircraft. Nashville was maneuvering as fast as 17 mph (27 km/h) in the tests.

A total of 24 MQ-8Bs are to be deployed on the Navy's littoral combat ships (LCS) from 2014 onwards. The Fire Scout significantly contributes to the LCS's primary mission roles of anti-submarine warfare, surface warfare and mine warfare. The ship's modular nature is complemented by the Fire Scout's own modular mission payloads. Due to changes in the LCS development schedule, the Navy conducted the Fire Scout Operational Evaluation (OpEval) aboard the frigate McInerney. On 10 December 2008, the Fire Scout first embarked aboard McInerney while in port for operational fit checks and ship integration testing. The Navy conducted Technical Evaluation on the Fire Scout on McInerney in late 2008 and Operational Evaluation in mid 2009. The Fire Scout was to reach Initial Operating Capability soon after the evaluation.

Flight tests of the Fire Scout took place in May 2009, these tests in areas of shipboard deck motion and wind envelope expansion and landings, including the use of the grid and harpoon system. During five days of testing, the ship/aircraft team compiled 19 flight hours during 12 flights, which included 54 landings, 37 of which were into the NATO standard grid. In September 2009, the Navy announced the first deployment of the MQ-8B aboard McInerney. On 3 April 2010, an MQ-8 from McInerney detected a speedboat and a support vessel engaged in smuggling cocaine in the Eastern Pacific, allowing the ship to confiscate 60 kg of cocaine and detain multiple suspects.

On 2 August 2010, an MQ-8 became unresponsive to commands during testing and entered restricted airspace around Washington, D.C. They were able to re-establish communications and regain control of the aircraft.

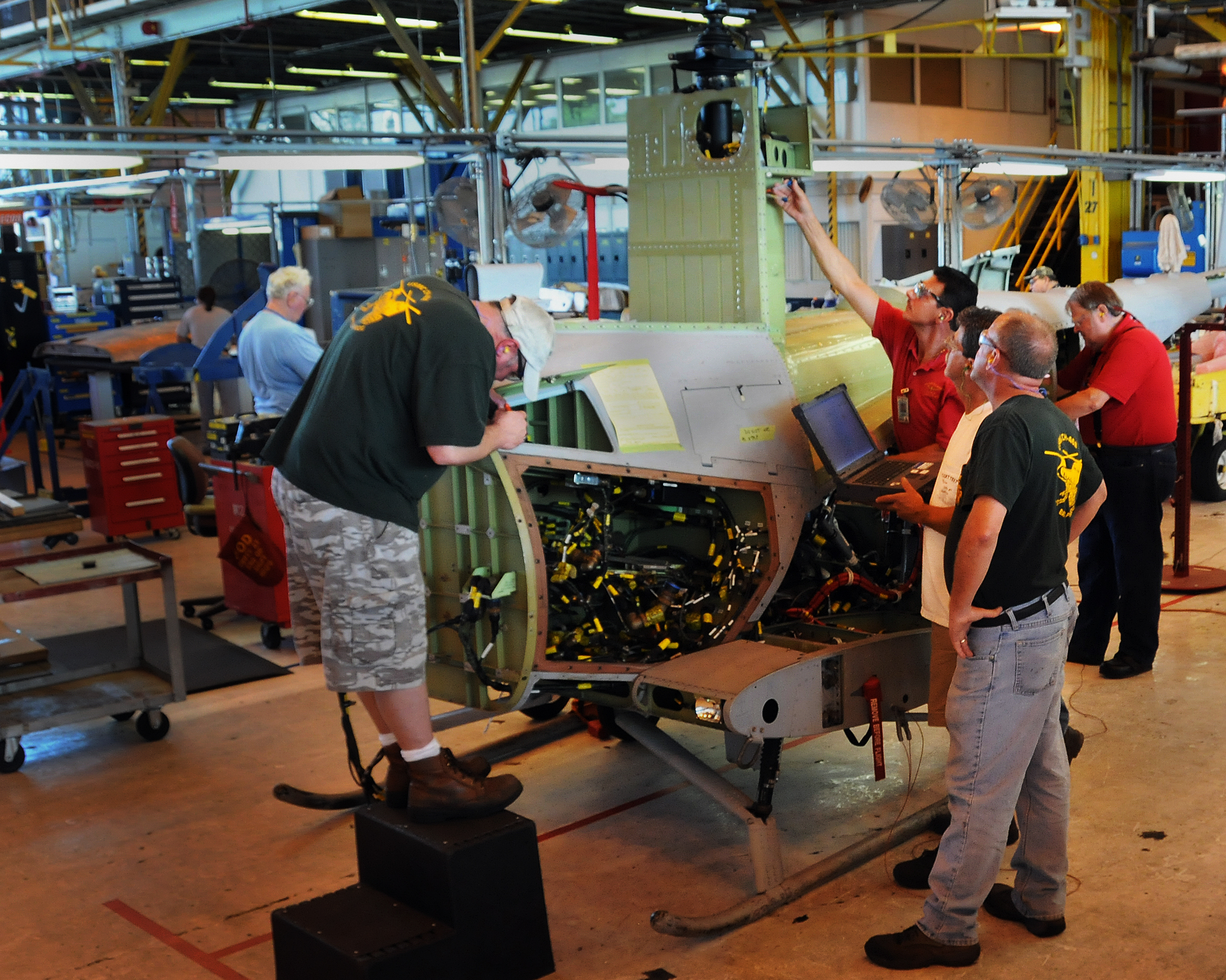
An MQ-8B undergoes maintenance by civilian technicians at Marine Corps Air Station Cherry Point, 2010

In May 2011, three MQ-8s were deployed to northern Afghanistan for intelligence, surveillance, and reconnaissance (ISR) purposes. During the 2011 military intervention in Libya, several Fire Scouts were operated on board the Halyburton by HSL-42 Squadron as part of Operation Unified Protector. On 21 June 2011, a MQ-8 from Halyburton was shot down by pro-Gaddafi forces during a reconnaissance mission.

The U.S. Navy briefly grounded the MQ-8B after two aircraft crashed within a week. In the first incident, a Fire Scout reportedly crashed off the coast of Africa on 30 March after it was unable to land on the frigate Simpson following a surveillance mission. On 6 April 2012, another Fire Scout crashed in Afghanistan. An investigation into the crash in Afghanistan determined the cause was a faulty navigation system. The cause of the crash near Simpson remained less clear, tougher maintenance procedures were put in place to prevent faulty aircraft from going on-mission. The Fire Scout was back flying over Afghanistan by May, and returned to sea-based ISR "anti-piracy" operations by August.

On 1 December 2012, Klakring returned from a five-month deployment supporting anti-piracy operations for the U.S. Africa Command. The Navy's fourth Fire Scout detachment logged over 500 flight hours and regularly maintained 12-hour days on station, switching to provide continuous support. One Fire Scout set a single-day record, providing ISR coverage for a 24-hour period in September 2012 over the course of 10 flights. On 31 March 2013, an MQ-8B deployed on Robert G. Bradley completed its 600th deployed flight hour, during the Fire Scout's fifth sea-based deployment. It was the first time a Helicopter Sea Combat Squadron (HSC-22) deployed with a Fire Scout; previous deployments were conducted by the Helicopter Maritime Strike community. Between 2006 and 2013, the Fire Scout flew over 8,000 hours, over half in real-world operations. In June 2013, Helicopter Strike Maritime Squadron (HSM) 46, Det. 9 surpassed the MQ-8B's monthly flight record at sea aboard Samuel B. Roberts, flying for 333 flight hours during the helicopter's sixth deployment.

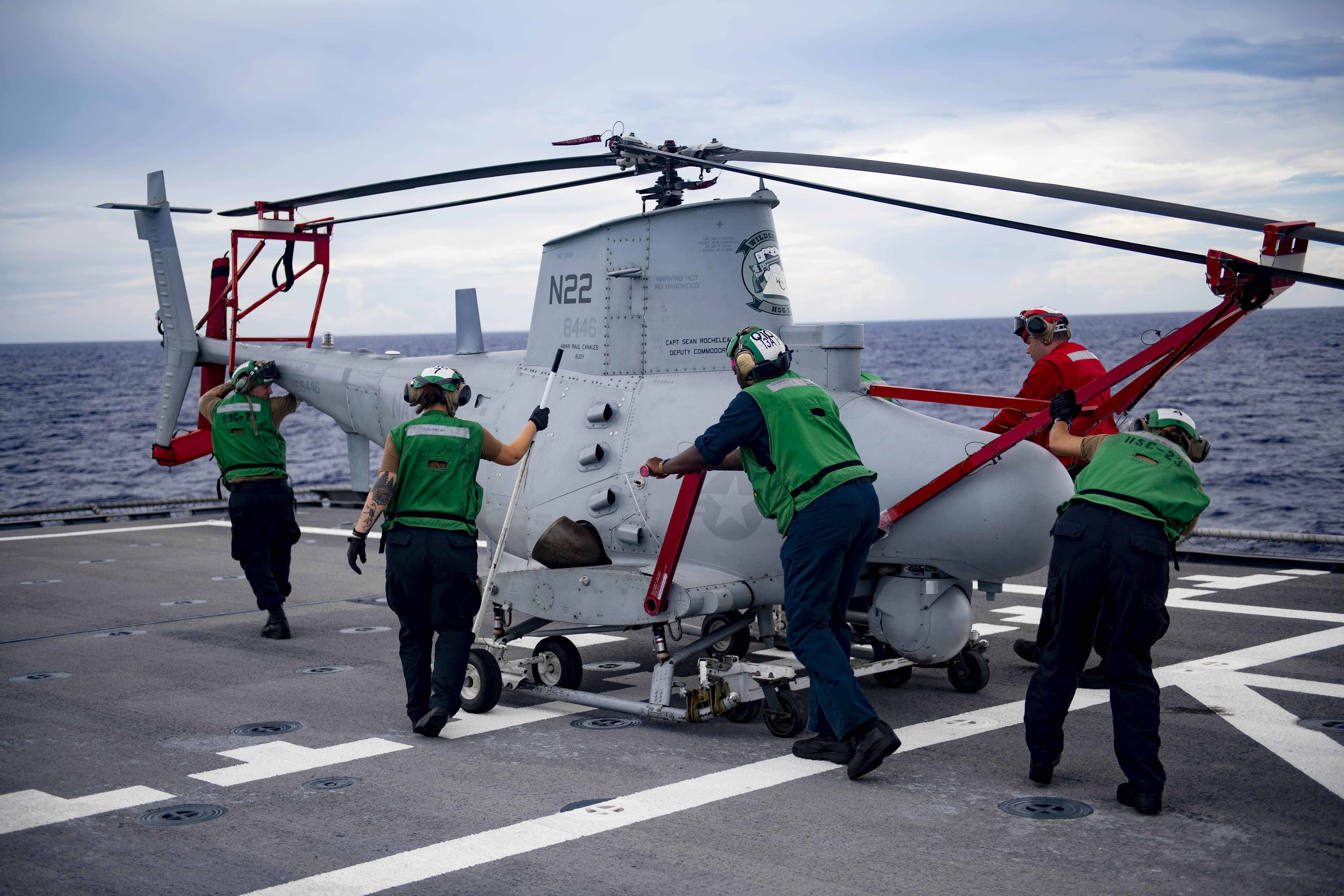
An MQ-8B aboard USS Gabrielle Giffords in 2019

In August 2013, the MQ-8B surpassed 5,000 flight hours in Afghanistan. In 28 months, Fire Scouts had accumulated 5,084 hours providing critical surveillance for U.S. and allied forces. Combined with testing and six at-sea deployments, the helicopter has over 10,000 flight hours supporting naval and ground forces. In late 2013, the Fire Scout ended its Afghanistan deployment mission and were shipped back to the US. MQ-8Bs will still be deployed on Naval frigates, and be integrated onto LCS. The Navy also ordered the Telephonics AN/ZPY-4 radar to expand surveillance capabilities. Twelve radars, including three spares, were to be delivered by December 2014. The Navy plans buy 96 MQ-8B/C Fire Scouts.

From 25 April to 16 May 2014, the LCS Freedom conducted the future concept of operations (CONOPS) for manned and unmanned helicopters aboard littoral combat ships. Operations had the manned MH-60R working together with the unmanned MQ-8B. The demonstration included one MH-60R and one MQ-8B flying with the surface warfare (SUW) mission package installed, intended to provide fleet protection against small boats and asymmetric threats. The tests were to demonstrate manned and unmanned helicopter capabilities before their initial deployment together, which set sail on 14 November 2014.

On 5 December 2014, a Navy MQ-8B successfully flew off of the U.S. Coast Guard cutter Bertholf, for the first time. The Fire Scout was controlled from a control station located on Bertholf. The Coast Guard intends to use the results of the demonstration to inform decisions on acquiring a UAS to enhance persistent maritime surveillance capabilities while lowering operational costs.

On 16 October 2016, the LCS Coronado deployed to Singapore with two MQ-8B Fire Scouts, which for the first time had the Telephonics AN/ZPY-4(V)1 radar, giving them a beyond the horizon broad area search and track capability to track up to 200 targets with surface search, terrain mapping, emergency beacon detection, and weather avoidance modes.

On 13 October 2018, Taiwan was reportedly cleared to purchase the MQ-8B variant, potentially making it the first export country.

The U.S. Navy retired its fleet of MQ-8Bs in October 2022 after 13 years of service, replacing it with the larger MQ-8C.

== Variants ==
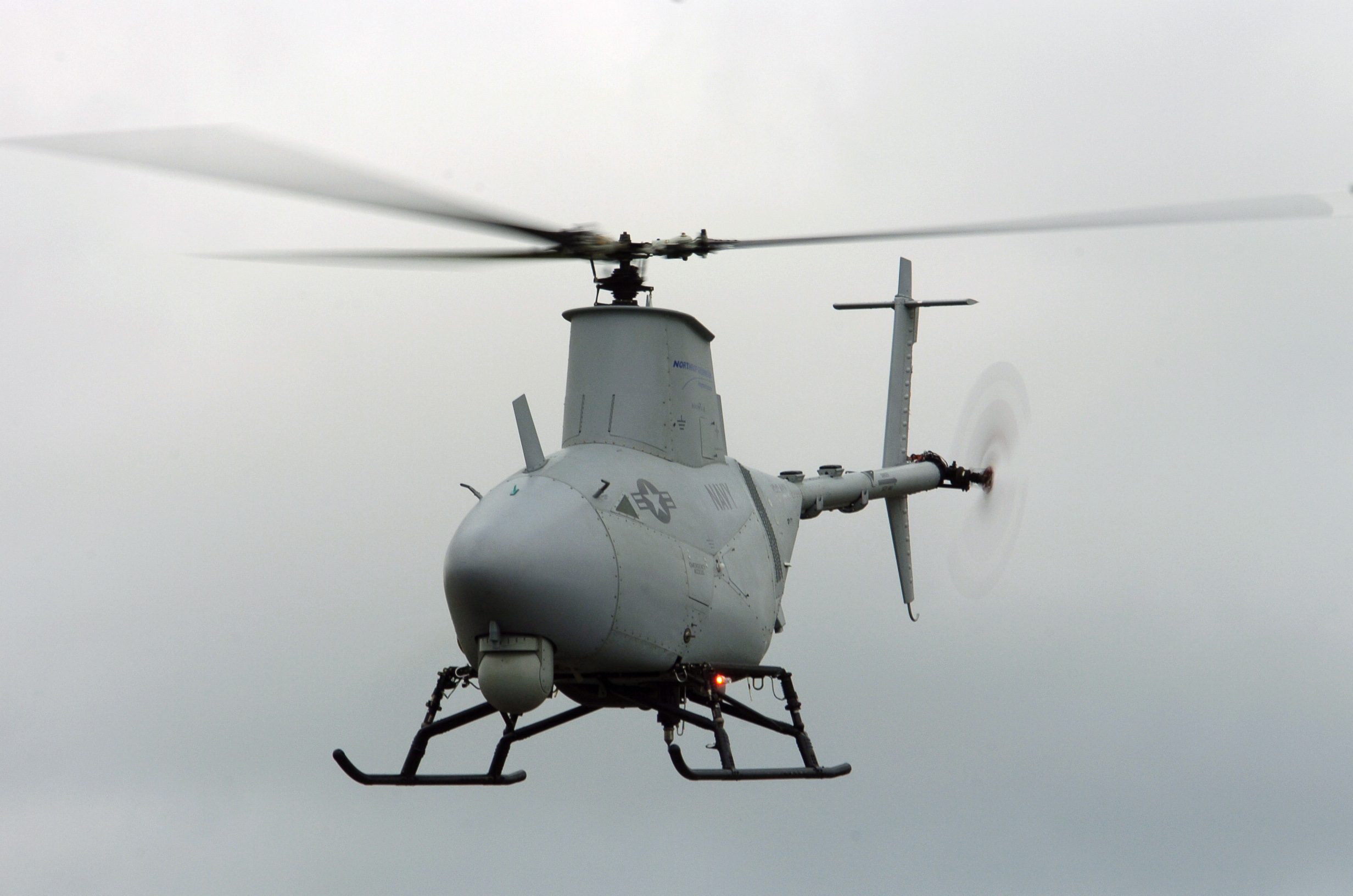
An RQ-8A Fire Scout takes off at the Webster Field Annex of NAS Patuxent River in 2005.

RQ-8A
RQ-8B
MQ-8B
Version has an 8-hour endurance with a 170 lb payload.
MQ-8C Fire-X/Fire Scout
Improved variant using avionics from the MQ-8B with the larger Bell 407 airframe.

== Former operators ==
United States

- United States Navy – 168 initially planned, reduced to 96 B- and C-models.

== Specifications (MQ-8B) ==
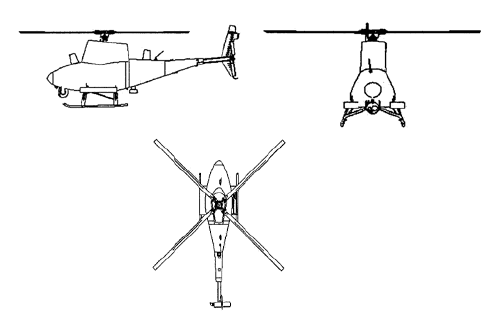
RQ-8B Fire Scout 3-view

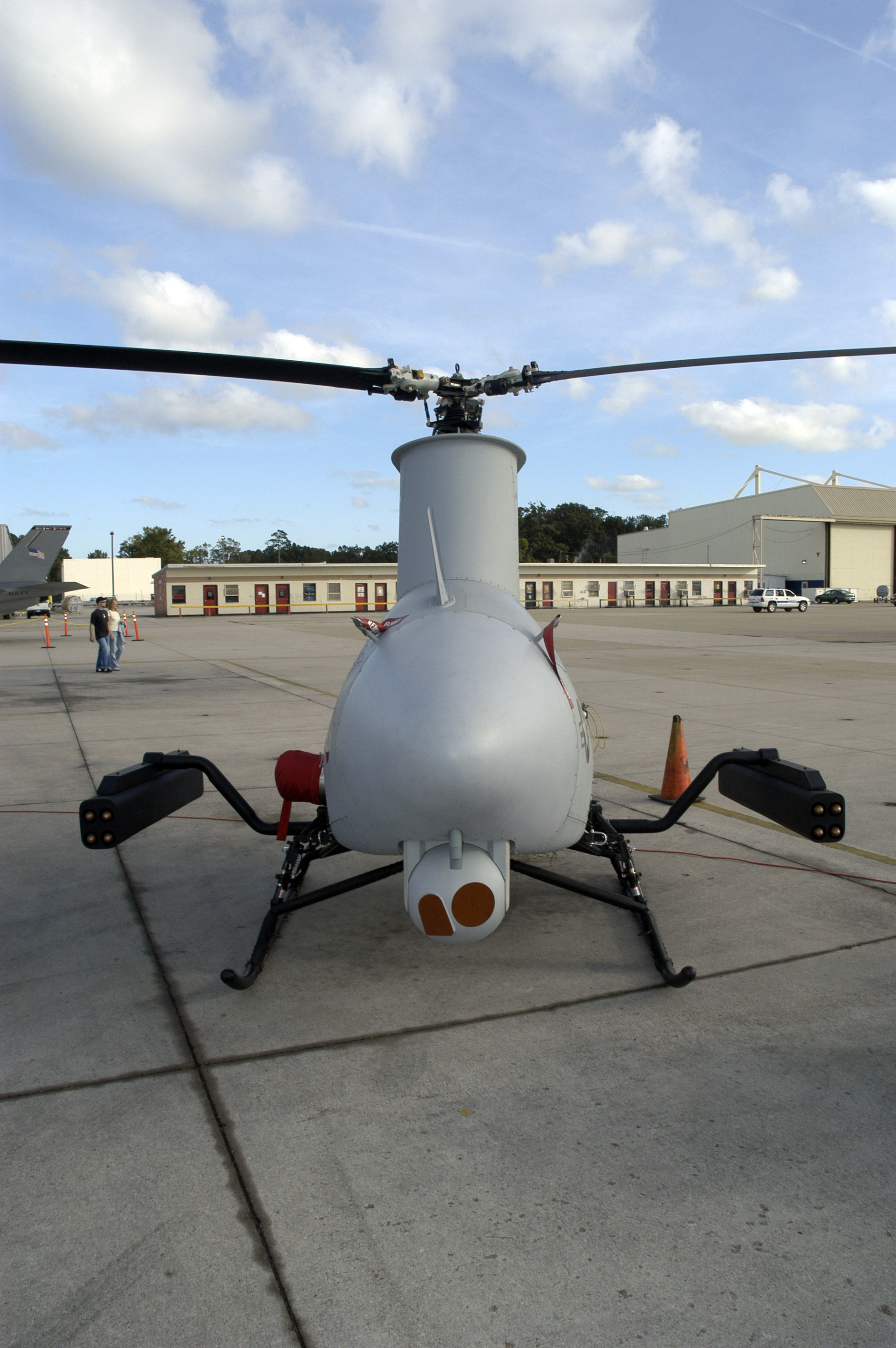
MQ-8B on static display showing Advanced Precision Kill Weapon System rocket pods. Naval Air Station Oceana, 2004

Data from Northrop Grumman, NAVAIR

General characteristics

- Crew: 0 (on-board)
- Capacity: 600 lb (272 kg)
- Length: 23 ft 11.4 in (7.3 m)
- Wingspan: 27 ft 6 in (8.4 m)
- Height: 9 ft 8.5 in (2.9 m)
- Empty weight: 2,073 lb (940.3 kg)
- Max takeoff weight: 3,150 lb (1,430 kg)
- Powerplant: 1 × Rolls-Royce 250 turboshaft, 420 hp (313 kW)

Performance

- Maximum speed: 115 kn (132 mph, 213 km/h)
- Cruise speed: 110 kn (130 mph, 200 km/h)
- Combat range: 110 nmi (130 mi, 200 km) with 5+ hours on station
- Endurance: 8 hours (typical), 5 hours fully loaded
- Service ceiling: 20,000 ft (6,100 m)

== See also ==
Related development

- Northrop Grumman MQ-8C Fire Scout
- Schweizer 330 and 333
- Schweizer S-434

Aircraft of comparable role, configuration, and era

- Bell Eagle Eye
- Boeing A160 Hummingbird
- Airbus Helicopters VSR700
- Leonardo Proteus

Related lists

- List of active United States military aircraft
