= Schweizer S333 =

Light helicopter

Schweizer 330 / S333
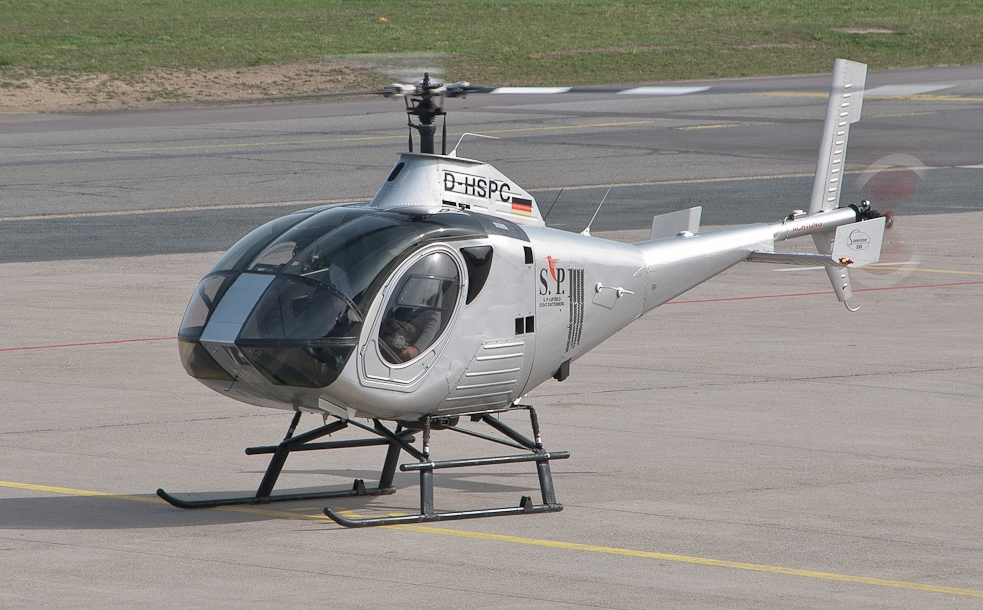
- Schweizer 333 on the apron

General information
- Type: Light utility and trainer helicopter
- Manufacturer: Schweizer Aircraft Corporation; Sikorsky Aircraft
- Status: Active In production
- Primary users: Dominican Air Force Royal Saudi Land Forces

History
- Manufactured: 1988–present
- Introduction date: 1992
- First flight: June 14, 1988
- Developed from: Schweizer S300
- Developed into: MQ-8 Fire Scout; Sikorsky S-434

The Schweizer 330 and S333 are turbine-powered developments of the Schweizer 300 light piston-powered helicopter. As of 2007, only the Schweizer 333 remains in production. In February 2009, the 333 was rebranded as the Sikorsky S-333. In 2018 the Schweizer R.S.G. bought the Schweizer Aircraft from Sikorsky Aircraft and it was rebranded as Schweizer S333 again.

== Development ==
=== Schweizer 330 ===
In 1987, Schweizer announced development of the Schweizer 330 using the dynamic components, rotors, controls and systems of the 300C; however, it was redesigned with an all-new fuselage. The first 330, converted from a 300C and powered by an Allison 250-C10A, flew on June 14, 1988. The FAA certified the aircraft in September 1992.

The improved 330SP was introduced in May 1997 and featured an improved rotor and raised skids, which could be retrofitted to previous 330 models. An Allison (later Rolls-Royce) 250-C20W turboshaft was derated to 165 kW (220 hp), giving the 330SP excellent hot and high performance, maintaining power output to 18,000 feet.

=== Schweizer 333 ===
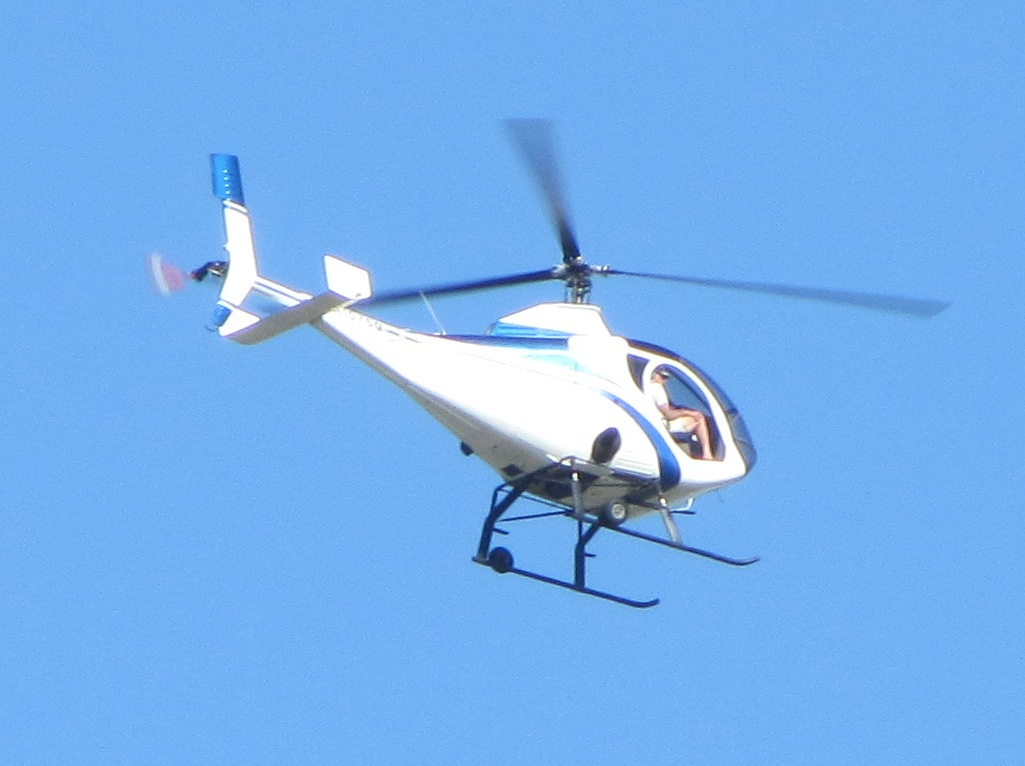
Schweizer 333

Shortly after the release of the 330, Schweizer began work on upgrading the dynamic components of the Schweizer 330SP. Over two years later, Schweizer released a new variant, the Schweizer 333. Featuring the newly developed dynamic systems components and new-technology rotor blades with a cambered airfoil and a larger diameter rotor, the upgraded helicopter benefited from a greater max gross weight, more useful load, more speed and more hover performance; nearly a 30% increase in performance over the 330SP. Schweizer created a kit to upgrade Model 330 and 330SP aircraft.

In February 2008, an improved version of the series, the S-434 was released.

== Design ==
The 330 used the 300C's dynamic components, a Rolls-Royce 250 turboshaft engine, and a new four-seat cockpit/cabin and body and new instrumentation.

== Operational history ==
Schweizer was purchased on August 26, 2004, by Sikorsky Aircraft. The Schweizer 300/333 models fill a gap in the Sikorsky helicopter line, which is known for its medium and heavy utility and cargo helicopters. Sikorsky has since taken advantage of Schweizer's rapid prototyping technology, originally used during development of the 333 dynamic components and the RQ-8 prototype, to develop the X-2 Technology Demonstrator.

== Variants ==
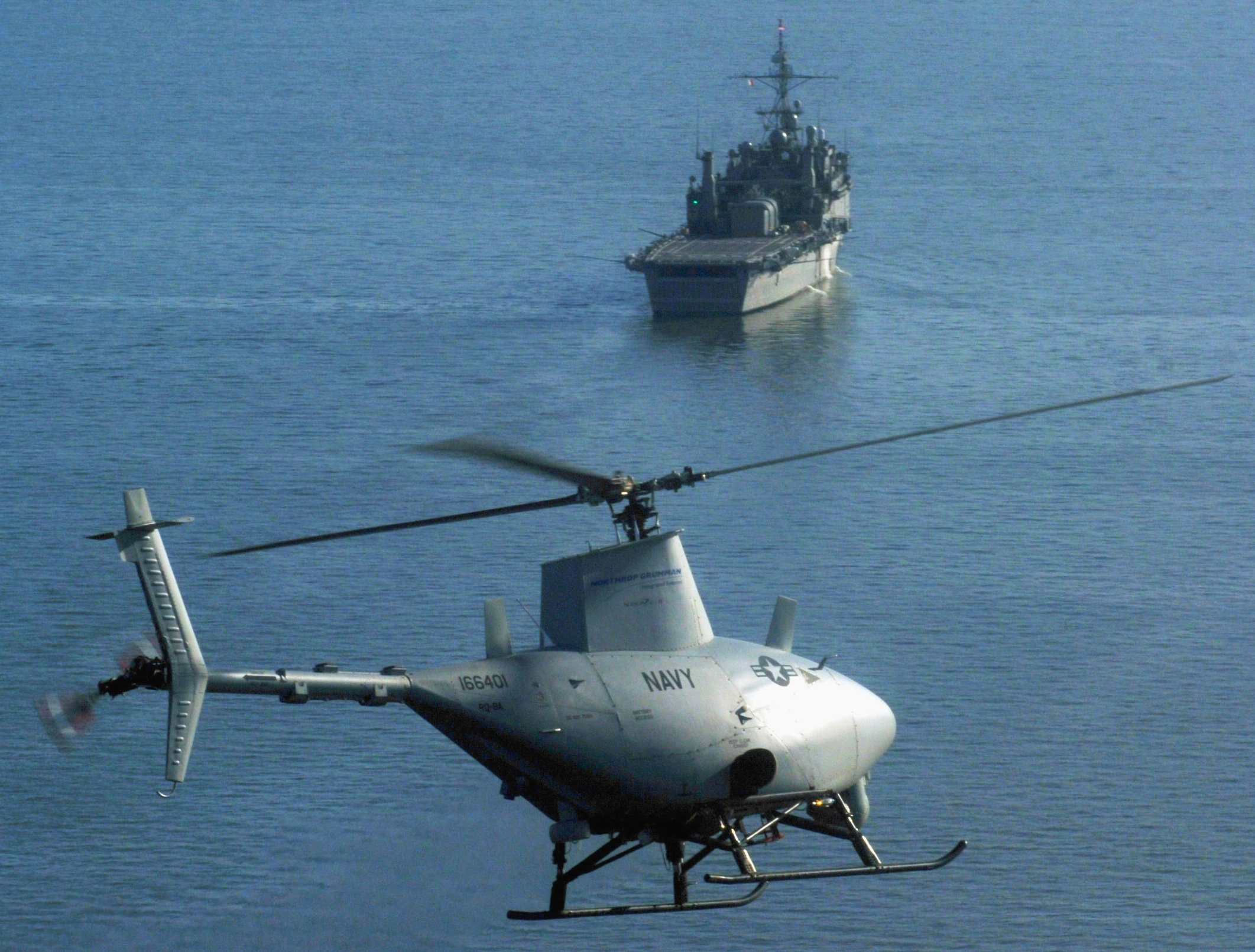
A RQ-8A Fire Scout helicopter preparing to land on the USS Nashville

330
Using the 300C dynamic components, Schweizer mounted a Rolls-Royce 250-C10A engine to the airframe and developed a new four-seat cockpit/cabin and body.
330SP
improved rotor and raised skids, Rolls-Royce 250-C20W engine.
333
Schweizer’s s333 turbine-powered aircraft features a 1,250 lb. useful load, making it a versatile platform for everything from military training and public service to personal use. With three- and four-seat configurations, this helicopter is an ideal initial turbine aircraft with lower direct operating costs comparable to other light turbine helicopters.
RQ-8/MQ-8 Fire Scout
The Northrop Grumman MQ-8B Fire Scout is an unmanned derivative of the Schweizer 330SP/333 helicopter, with a new fuselage, new fuel system, and UAV electronics and sensors. It also utilizes a new four-bladed rotor system based on that of the Schweizer 333. The Fire Scout is currently in development for the United States Navy's VTUAV program with cooperation from Northrop Grumman. The original RQ-8A was based on the 330SP.
Sikorsky S-434
Based on improvements developed for the MQ-8B, this is a new version of the 333, having a four-bladed main rotor.

== Operators ==
Dominican Republic

- Dominican Air Force

Saudi Arabia

- Saudi Arabian Army

=== Non-state operators ===
- Peshmerga & Ministry of Interior Aviation

== Specifications (333) ==
Data from International Directory of Civil Aircraft and Technical specifications

General characteristics

- Crew: 1–2
- Capacity: 1–3 passengers
- Length: 31 ft 2 in (9.50 m) overall
- Height: 11 ft 0 in (3.35 m)
- Empty weight: 1,210 lb (549 kg)
- Gross weight: 2,460 lb (1,116 kg)
- Max takeoff weight: 2,550 lb (1,157 kg)
- Powerplant: 1 × Rolls-Royce M250-C20W turboshaft engine, 235 shp (175 kW)
- Main rotor diameter: 27 ft 6 in (8.38 m)
- Main rotor area: 594 sq ft (55.2 m^{2}) (blade section: NACA 0015 modified)

Performance

- Cruise speed: 105 kn (121 mph, 194 km/h)
- Range: 319 nmi (367 mi, 591 km)
- Rate of climb: 1,380 ft/min (7.0 m/s)

== See also ==
Related development

- Northrop Grumman MQ-8 Fire Scout
- Schweizer S300
- Sikorsky S-434

Aircraft of comparable role, configuration, and era

- Enstrom 480
- Robinson R66
