= Enstrom Helicopter Corporation =

American helicopter manufacturing company

- Type: Manufacturer
- Industry: Aerospace
- Founded: 22 December 1959
- Headquarters: Menominee, Michigan, United States
- Key people: Matt Francour (CEO)
- Products: Helicopters
- Revenue: US$37.5 million
- Owner: Surack Enterprises 2022-present
- Number of employees: 200 (2013)
- Website: enstromhelicopter.com

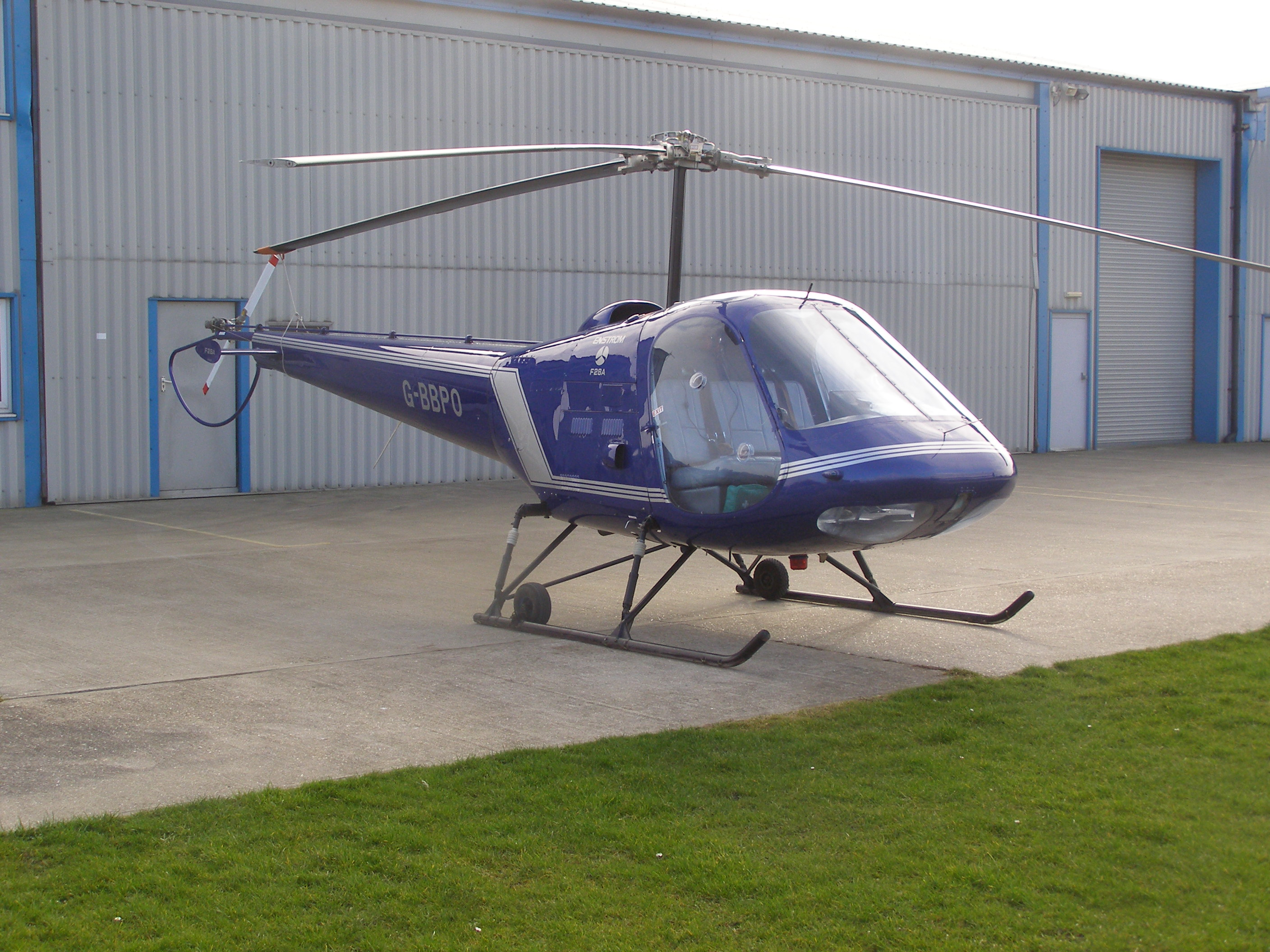
1973 model F-28A

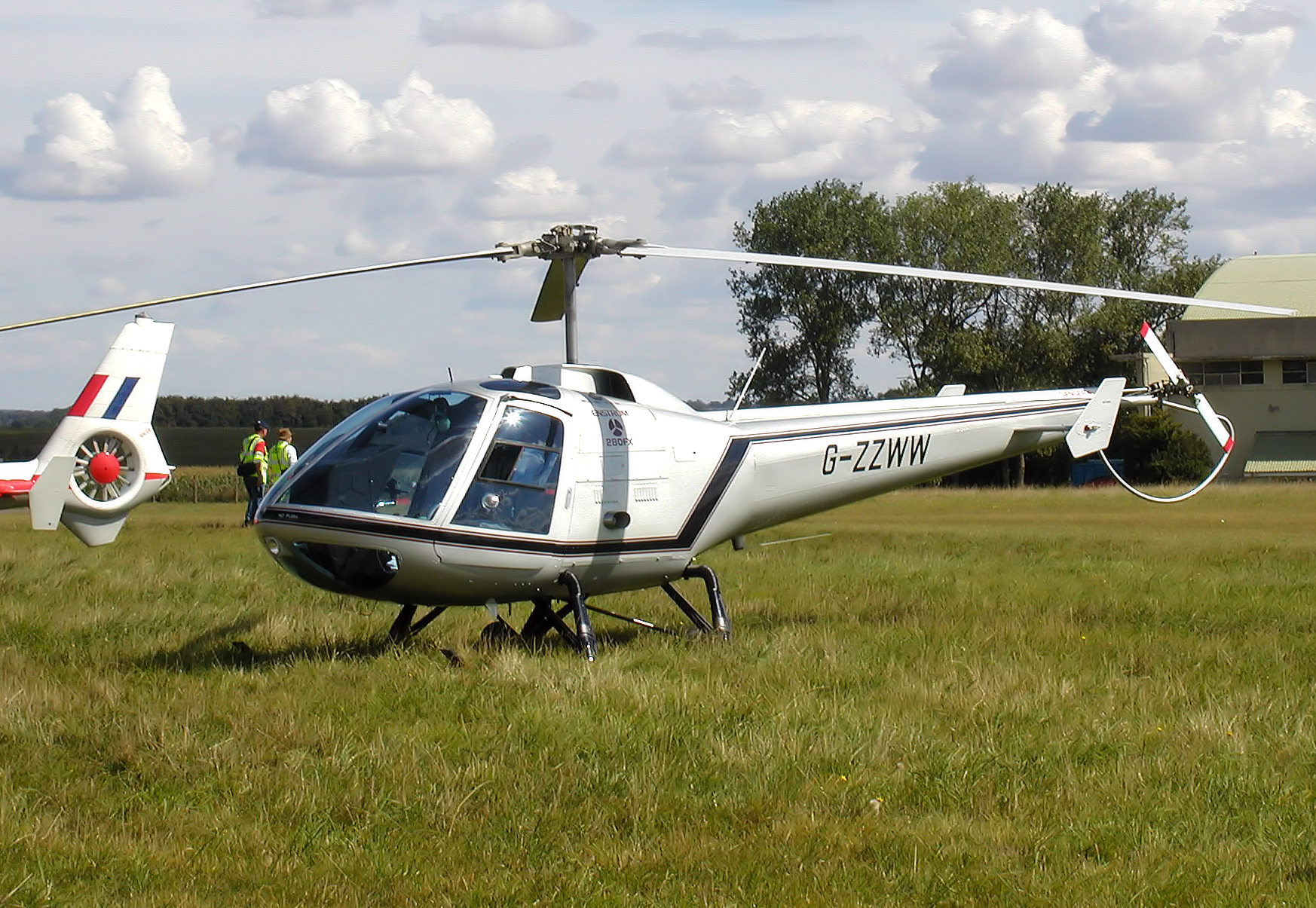
Enstrom 280FX Shark, an aerodynamically restyled Enstrom F-28 for the corporate market.

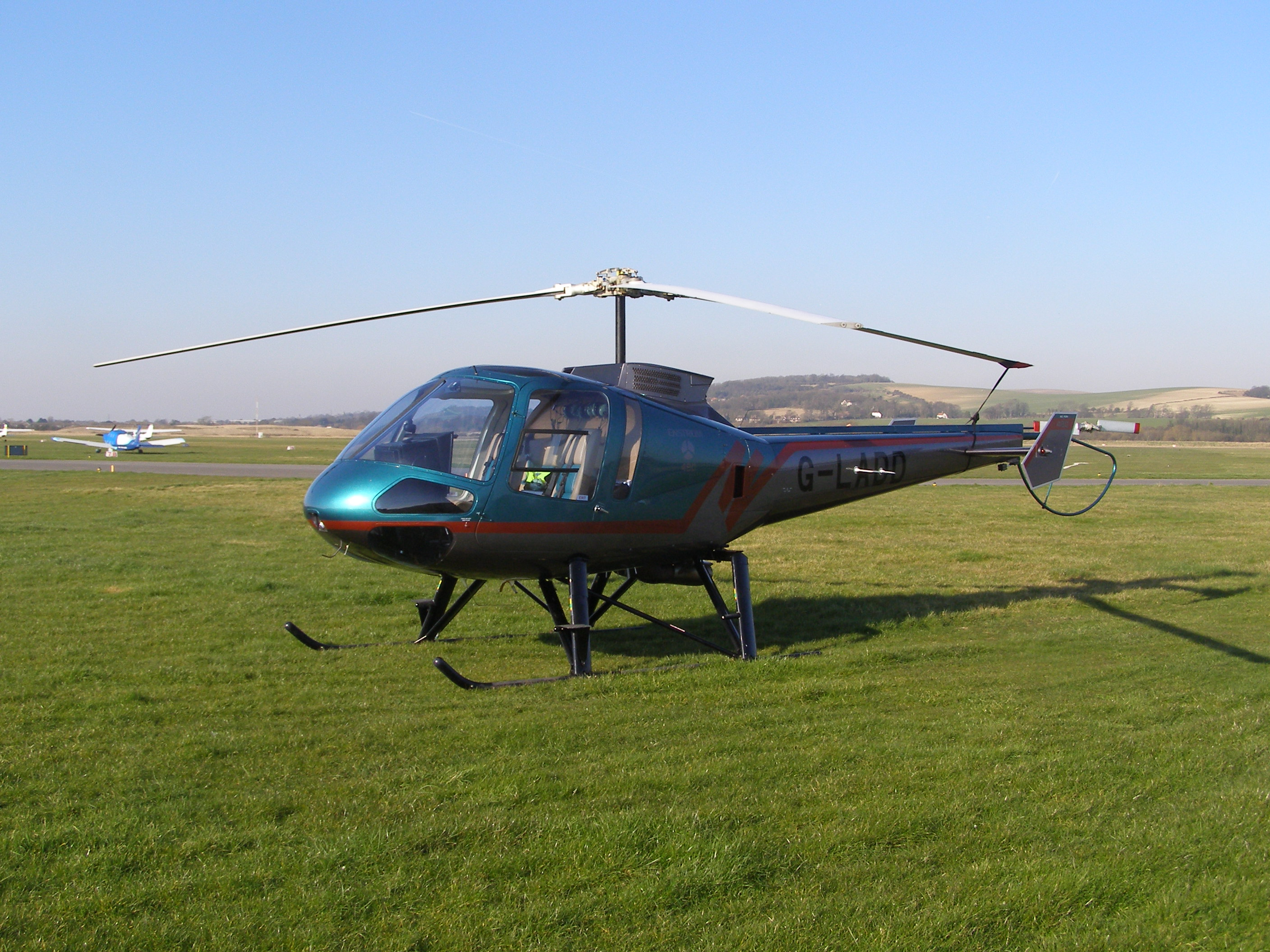
1999 model Enstrom 480

The Enstrom Helicopter Corporation is an American helicopter aerospace manufacturer, based at the Menominee–Marinette Twin County Airport in Michigan, United States.

The company was founded in 1959 by mining engineer Rudolph J. "Rudy" Enstrom, initially as the R.J. Enstrom Corp. The company was bought by the Chongqing Helicopter Investment Corporation in 2013 and went out of business in January 2022.

Surack Enterprises purchased the assets of the company from bankruptcy in May 2022 and production was restarted, with the first helicopter completed in January 2023.

== History ==
Enstrom began by attempting to design his own helicopter. His lack of training in this area meant that his first efforts were not outstanding, but his efforts were noticed by local Upper Peninsula businessmen, who decided to back him. They recruited several experienced aeronautical engineers, and the group was incorporated as the R.J. Enstrom Co. (1959).

The company's first product was the piston-powered F-28 (1965). However, Enstrom had been removed from the company before that product came onto the market, although the company continued to carry his name.

In October 1968, a controlling interest in Enstrom was bought by Purex Industries, who wanted to develop a turbine powered version, a project that was not completed until over 20 years later. The lack of success with this venture led the piston engine variants to languish and the Purex stake was bought by F. Lee Bailey, a well-known American criminal defense attorney, in January 1971, changing to the current name. Bailey was an enthusiastic entrepreneur and soon had the factory producing over a hundred helicopters per year. He also orchestrated the development and certification of the 280 Shark, which was introduced to the market in 1974. It was an immediate sales success. Encouraged, Bailey embarked the design of a four-place stretched version of the Shark (designated 280L Hawk), but the combination of technical problems with this development and a cooling economy drained the company's financial reserves, and Bailey sold the company in 1979. Since then it has changed hands several times. Owners have included Victor Kiam and Dean Kamen, developer of the Segway PT people-mover.

Kamen worked to improve the company's existing products and to introduce the turbine-powered 480, which was originally developed as a response to a request for bids on a military training helicopter. The company was sold to an unnamed Swiss investor in 2000; Kamen remained with the company as an advisor. In January 2013 the company was purchased by the Chongqing Helicopter Investment Corporation of the People's Republic of China.

Jerry M. Mullins was president and CEO of Heli-Dyne Systems Inc. in Hurst, Texas before he succeeded the former CEO Peter Parsinen. Prior to Mullins, the president and chief executive officer was Steve Daniels.

Since delivering their first helicopter shortly after the Federal Aviation Administration type certification of the F-28 model in April 1965, Enstrom produced over 1,100 helicopters, up to July 2011. However, the Great Recession considerably slowed its output and the company dropped to only 60 employees. It built only six helicopters in 2010. By early 2013 with Chinese investment the company was expanding, having increased its workforce to 200 people and planned to expand its physical facilities, due to increased sales, mostly in Asia. In 2013 the company built 26 helicopters.

The company produced three models, the F-28, the more aerodynamic 280 and the turbine-engined 480, each with their own variants. The F-28 and 280 are powered by Lycoming piston engines similar to those found in general aviation fixed-wing aircraft.

A hallmark of Enstrom's helicopter designs was the lack of exposed pitch change links for the main rotor, as the mechanisms are contained inside the hollow main rotor shaft, lowering aerodynamic drag.

Enstrom was contracted by the Venezuelan government in 2014 to supply sixteen training variants of the Enstrom 480 helicopter to the country's armed forces. The deal marked the first time Venezuela had purchased a helicopter from a U.S. manufacturer in a decade. The deal included spare parts and technical assistance. The first of the helicopters were delivered in October 2015.

Enstrom ranked third in sales of piston helicopters, with 22 machines delivered in 2018 and 16 in 2019.

In January 2022 the company declared Chapter 7 bankruptcy due to "several financial difficulties". Technical support for Enstrom customers ceased on January 19, 2022 and the Menominee factory closed on January 21, 2022. At the time of its closure the company had 30 employees. A number of companies expressed interest in buying the company's assets and re-opening the business.

MidTex Aviation intended to purchase Enstrom's assets in March 2022, in a deal approved by the United States Bankruptcy Court for the Western District of Michigan as part of the Chapter 7 liquidation process. MidTex planned to manufacture parts for the existing Enstrom fleet and also build new aircraft, through the formation of a new company, Enstrom Aerospace Industries, to be located in the old Enstrom plant at Menominee, Michigan. MidTex Aviation's financing was not secured and the purchase failed.

In May 2022 Surack Enterprises purchased Enstrom with the initial aim of restarting parts production, followed by helicopter production and the development of new products to "improve and update" the Enstrom fleet. In December 2022, the company was granted an FAA production certificate, allowing the manufacturing of parts under company quality control. The first new-production helicopter, an Enstrom 480B, was flown in January 2023. In April 2023 the company announced the sale of two 480Bs to the Zambian Air Force, which will be among the first new production helicopters delivered since the company's sale.

== Products ==
- Enstrom F-27 c. 1957-1960
- Enstrom F-28 – piston engine
- Enstrom TH180 – training (piston engine)
- Enstrom 280 – aerodynamically restyled F-28
- Enstrom 480 – turbine engine
