= Sikorsky S-434 =

Light turbine-powered helicopter

S-434

General information
- Type: Light utility and trainer helicopter
- National origin: United States
- Manufacturer: Sikorsky Aircraft
- Status: In service
- Primary user: Saudi Ministry of the Interior

History
- Manufactured: 2008–2015
- First flight: 18 December 2008

The Sikorsky S-434 is a light, turbine-powered helicopter. The S-434 is an improved development of the Schweizer S333.

== Design and development ==
The prototype S-434 first flew on 18 December 2008 at Horseheads, New York. The S-434 evolved from the S-333, and has many features developed for the MQ-8 Fire Scout. It shares its cockpit layout with the S-333, which gives the crew very good visual capacities and handling characteristics.

On June 15, 2009, Sikorsky announced the delivery of the first two S-434s to Saudi Arabia's Ministry of the Interior, the first of a total of nine.

== Variants ==
S-434
based on improvements developed for the MQ-8B; powered by one Rolls-Royce 250-C20W turboshaft engine of 320 shp.

== Operators ==
Saudi Arabia

- Ministry of the Interior

== Specifications (S-434) ==
Data from Sikorsky Helicopter

General characteristics

- Length: 30 ft 10 in (9.40 m)
- Height: 11 ft (3.4 m)
- Cabin width: 67.6 in (1.72 m)
- Cabin height: 53.3 in (1.35 m)
- Empty weight: 1,345 lb (610 kg)
- Gross weight: 2,900 lb (1,315 kg)
- Max takeoff weight: 3,200 lb (1,451 kg) with external load
- Fuel capacity: 84 US gal (70 imp gal; 318 L)
- Powerplant: 1 × Rolls Royce 250-C20W turboshaft engine, 320 shp (240 kW) for take-off
- Main rotor diameter: 27 ft 6 in (8.38 m)
- Main rotor area: 792 sq ft (73.6 m^{2}) 4-bladed main rotor

Performance

== See also ==
Related development

- Northrop Grumman MQ-8 Fire Scout
- Schweizer S333

Aircraft of comparable role, configuration, and era

- Bell 206
- Enstrom 480
- Robinson R66
