= Target acquisition minefield detection system =

Bomb-detection system

Target acquisition minefield detection system (also known as the "Airborne standoff minefield detection system", or ASTAMIDS) is a bomb-detection system engineered to detect improvised explosive devices (IED). It provides a unit of action (UA) asset that can be used in tactical operations in day or night, to detect and locate surface obstacles and recently buried minefields. ASTAMIDS is currently being tested in the Northrop Grumman MQ-8B Fire Scout unmanned aerial vehicle.

== Detection methods ==
=== Coherent change detection ===
The ASTAMIDS detects improvised explosives and minefields using two techniques. The first technique used to find explosives is a process known as coherent change detection. Change detection compares two images for inconsistencies. To detect whether or not a change has occurred, two images are taken of the same scene, but at different times. These images are then geometrically registered so that the same target pixels in each image align. After the images are registered, they are checked pixel by pixel. Where a change has not occurred between the two images, the pixels remain the same. When the pixels are different, a change has occurred.

This technique is useful for detecting change, but it does not measure direction or the magnitude of change. One of the major issues in the change detection software is defining what a "significant" change is. Trees blowing in the wind will sometimes produce a change between the pixels of the two images. This is obviously not a significant change, but the system must be sensitive enough to detect small roadside bombs. These improvised explosives may create a smaller pixel change than trees on a windy day. This problem causes the mine detection algorithms to be extremely complex. The software must differentiate changes that do not pose a threat to changes that are likely to be a minefield or roadside bomb.

=== Tactical synthetic aperture radar ===
The other technique that helps the ASTAMIDS successfully detect minefields and road side bombs uses a combination of the tactical synthetic aperture radar ability to penetrate the ground and a group of multi-spectral electro-optical sensors that cover the visible and near-infrared (VNIR) and mid-wave infrared (MWIR) portions of the spectrum, as well as a target laser rangefinder and designator.

Once an IED is found using the change detection method, the laser rangefinder and designator flashes to the point where the change was detected. A seeker is then used to find the lasers pulse rate and guides the EO / IR sensors of the ASTAMIDS to the point. Now that the sensors know what point to scan, the mission specific hardware, software, and firmware components installed in the ASTAMIDS can successfully detect mines buried under the surface.
