= SS Spitfire =

SS Spitfire may refer to a former United States Navy oiler, or to one of two Type C2-S-B1 ships built for the United States Maritime Commission:

- SS Spitfire (1942), built by Sun Shipbuilding & Drydock in Chester, Pennsylvania as Esso Columbia; commissioned as USS Atascosa (AO-66), later Esso Syracuse, forepart combined into Esso Buffalo and, converted to a bulk carrier, Spitfire; scrapped in 1973.
- SS Spitfire (1943) (MC hull number 1160), built by Moore Dry Dock in Oakland, California; later became USS Capricornus (AKA-57/LKA-57); scrapped in 1985
- SS Spitfire (1946) (MC hull number 2818), built by Consolidated Steel in Wilmington, California; scrapped in 1975
