= Chuck Surack =

American musician and businessman

Chuck Surack is an American entrepreneur, philanthropist and musician, best known as the founder of Sweetwater Sound, one of the world's largest retailers of musical instruments and professional audio equipment.

== Biography ==
=== Early life ===
Surack was born in Waverly, Ohio, his family later relocating to Fort Wayne, Indiana. Surack was active in the Boy Scouts, and attended Wayne High School, where he played saxophone in the school's marching band. Following high school, Surack toured with a band as a saxophone player and keyboardist. In 1979 Surack decided to stop touring, and returned to his hometown of Fort Wayne, where he has continued to work as a musician, playing saxophone and keyboard as part of two bands, Prime Time and the Sweetwater All Stars. He also created a mobile 4-track recording studio in his Volkswagen Bus.

=== Career ===
==== Sweetwater Sound ====
Surack soon established a recording studio in his home and named it Sweetwater Sound. In 1985, he purchased a Kurzweil K250 keyboard for use in the studio and commissioned an engineer to reverse engineer it in order to develop and use sounds of his own design, establishing Surack as an expert within the K250 community. Sweetwater Sound was eventually selling K250 sound libraries and became established as a Kurzweil K250 reseller. Being part of the small professional K250 community allowed Surack to develop relationships and work with artists such as Kenny Rogers and Stevie Wonder. Sweetwater began selling more and more pro audio equipment, and eventually Sweetwater's retail business surpassed its recording studio business. By 2016, Sweetwater had become the largest online retailer of music instruments and equipment in the U.S. Surack remains Founder and Chairman of Sweetwater Sound, with John Hopkins taking over as CEO in July 2021.

==== Surack Enterprises ====
Beginning in 2010, Surack acquired and founded several other businesses, which came to be referred to as the Sweet Family of Companies and later became subsidiaries of Surack Enterprises.

- SweetCars In February 2010, Surack submitted a proposal to convert an abandoned building on Jefferson Boulevard in Fort Wayne into a luxury car dealership to the Fort Wayne Redevelopment Commission, which agreed to transfer the property to Surack in exchange for his financial commitment to improve the property in order to open and operate the dealership. The car dealership, SweetCars, opened in December 2011.
- Sweet Aviation In August 2011, Surack acquired the assets of Smith Field Air Services and established Sweet Aviation, a Fort Wayne flight school.
- Longe Optical In September 2012, Surack purchased the assets of Longe Optical, a Fort Wayne-based retailer of prescription eyewear and prescription sunglasses with 5 storefronts.
- Sweet Helicopters In 2012, Surack founded Indiana Helicopters, a helicopter charter service based in Goshen, Indiana, and purchased Helimotion, an aerial film production and executive charter service based in Chicago, two years later. In August 2017 Indiana Helicopters merged with Helimotion to form Sweet Helicopters.
- Aviation Specialty Insurance Surack also acquired Aviation Specialty Insurance, a company formerly known as Corporate Aviation Insurance Group (CAIG) that provides general aviation insurance services.
- The Clyde Theatre In 2018, Surack increased his majority ownership stake to assume full ownership of The Clyde Theatre, a Fort Wayne music venue and event center.
- The Club Room at the Clyde In 2019, he opened The Club Room at the Clyde, a restaurant adjacent to the Clyde Theatre,
- Crescendo Coffee and More In the summer of 2020, Surack opened Crescendo Coffee and More, a café adjacent to the Club Room at the Clyde.
- Enstrom Helicopter Corporation In May 2022, Surack Enterprises acquired the assets of Enstrom Helicopter Corporation, an American helicopter aerospace manufacturer based in Menominee, Michigan.
- The Pearl In 2022, the Suracks announced The Pearl, a 7-story residential, commercial, and entertainment mixed-use development located at 248 W. Main Street in downtown Fort Wayne, with anticipated completion in late summer 2024.
- whatzup Surack is the owner of whatzup, a tabloid and website that focuses on entertainment.

In 2020, Surack purchased the former headquarters of Pizza Hut of Fort Wayne and improved it to create The Kaizen Center. Originally intended as a corporate event space, the facility now serves as the corporate offices for Surack Enterprises and its two subsidiary organizations: the Sweet Family of Companies and the Surack Family Foundation.

In May 2024, Surack became a co-owner of the Indianapolis-based Indy Eleven professional soccer team.

=== Philanthropy ===
Surack and his wife Lisa contribute to more than 600 nonprofit organizations annually, with past charitable donations to the Indiana University Jacobs School of Music, Arts United of Fort Wayne, the Fort Wayne Philharmonic Orchestra, Easter Seals ARC of Northeast Indiana, Taylor University, and the Voices of Unity Youth Choir. Surack and his wife also established the Chuck and Lisa Surack Endowed Scholarship for Music Technology at the University of Saint Francis.

In July 2021, Surack and his wife Lisa established the Surack Family Foundation, with the intention of providing grants to nonprofits in the areas of music and arts that they have historically supported, but also mental health, teenage suicide prevention, child and family welfare, and economic development in Northeast Indiana.

Surack is the past board chair for the Fort Wayne Philharmonic Orchestra, Global Leadership Summit & Beyond Fort Wayne, and the Fort Wayne Children's Zoo and previously on the Board of Directors of the NAMM Foundation, and NAMM Board Current Board Chair of the Boys & Girls Club of Northeast Indiana, and currently serving on the Canterbury School, EasterSeals Arc, Fortitude Fund, and Love Fort Wayne boards.

=== Personal life ===
Surack is married to his wife Lisa, with whom he has two stepsons, Tyler and Cameron, and a daughter, Adderly (whose name was influenced by the name of saxophonist Cannonball Adderley). He has cited his father, Jim, a chemical engineer and airplane pilot, as a major influence.

== Recognition ==
- 1997 Ernst and Young 1997 Northern Indiana Entrepreneur Of The Year
- 2008 BCA 10 Award presented by the Business Committee of the Arts, in recognition of corporate support of the arts
- 2008 Appleseed Award presented by Representative Mark Souder in recognition of the inclusion of numerous environmentally-friendly features at Sweetwater Sound's campus
- 2009 Governor's Arts Award, presented by Indiana Governor Mitch Daniels in recognition of ongoing commitment to and support of the arts.
- 2009 Lifetime Achievement Award awarded by the University of St. Francis School of Creative Arts for integrating electronic music instrument technologies, computers and traditional music practices into a modern art and science
- 2009 Lugar Energy Patriot awarded by Indiana Senator Dick Lugar in recognition of leadership and initiative in taking action to improve America's energy security and promoting sustainable energy production and use.
- 2012 Doctorate of Humane Letters from Indiana University
- 2012 Doctorate of Humane Letters from the University of Saint Francis
- 2013 Inducted into the Indiana Academy by the Independent Colleges of Indiana for lifetimes of achievement and contribution to the state of Indiana
- 2014 Humanitarian of the Year Award from the American Red Cross for humanitarian contributions to the local community
- 2014 Leaders of Character Award from the Anthony Wayne Area Council of the Boy Scouts of America
- 2015 Maclyn Parker Swagger Award by Greater Fort Wayne
- 2015 Red Coat recipient from Mad Anthony Children's Foundation for recognition of accomplishments that help make Fort Wayne and the state of Indiana a better place
- 2015 Citizen of the Year from the Journal Gazette
- 2016 Lion Award by the Fort Wayne Urban League for immense community contributions and accolades
- 2017 Legends of Leadership Award from the editors of Fort Wayne Business Weekly
- 2018 awarded The Sagamore of the Wabash by Indiana Governor Eric Holcomb
- 2018 Doctorate of Humane Letters from Taylor University
- 2018 Inducted into the Indiana Boys and Girls Club Hall Of Fame
- 2019 Indiana Chamber of Commerce's 2019 Ogletree Deakins Business Leader of the Year
- 2022 Doctor of Humane Letters from Trine University
- 2022 Visionary Leadership Award - Believe in Dream
- 2023 Bridge of Grace- Catalyst of Hope Award
- 2022, 2023, 2024 IBJ's Indiana 250 - Most Influential Business Leaders In Indiana

== See also ==
- Sweetwater Sound
