= USS Spitfire =

USS Spitfire may refer to the following ships of the United States Navy:

- USS Spitfire (1776 gunboat), a gunboat on Lake Champlain.
- USS Spitfire (1776), a Rhode Island galley captured by the British in 1778 during the Mount Hope Bay raids.
- USS Spitfire (1803), a merchant sloop operated until 1820.
- USS Spitfire (1814), a ship operated until 1816.
- USS Spitfire (1846), a sidewheel gunboat operated until 1848; used during the Mexican–American War
- USS Hyacinth (1862), a tugboat that was renamed Spitfire when operated by Union forces on the Mississippi River during the American Civil War
- USS Spitfire (1869), a temporary name of Casco-class monitor USS Suncook while laid up in 1869
