= Enstrom F-28 =

Light, piston-powered helicopter family

F-28 / 280
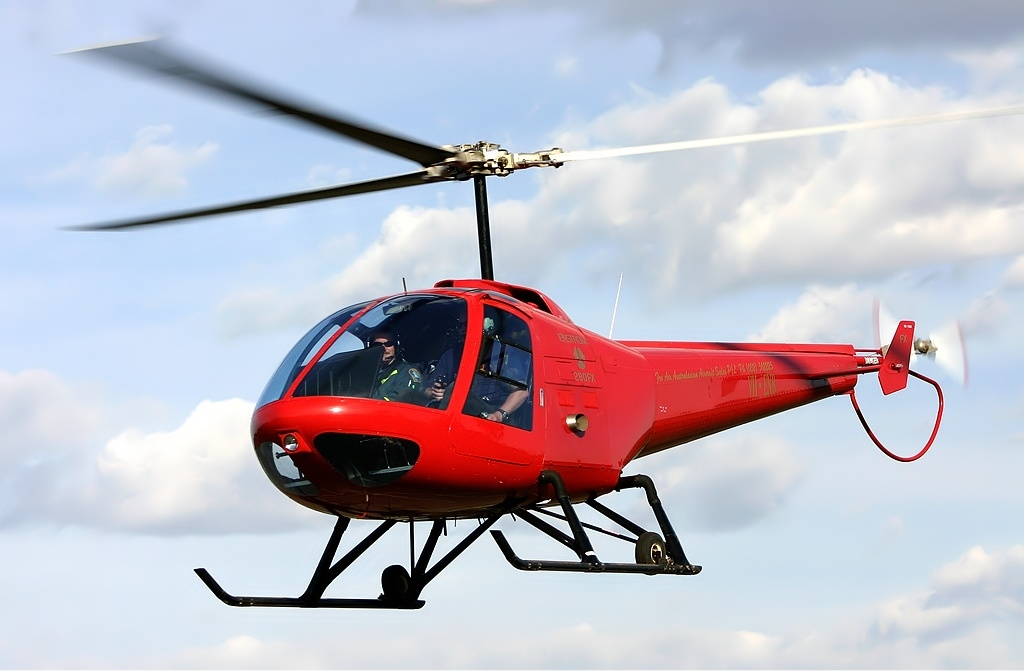
- Enstrom 280FX Shark

General information
- Type: Light helicopter
- Manufacturer: Enstrom Helicopter Corporation

History
- Manufactured: 1965-present
- Introduction date: 1965
- Variants: Enstrom TH180; Spitfire Mark I
- Developed into: Enstrom 480

The Enstrom F-28 and 280 are a family of small, light piston engine powered helicopters produced by the Enstrom Helicopter Corporation.

== Design and development ==
Since delivering their first helicopter shortly after Federal Aviation Administration type certification of the F-28 model in April 1965, Enstrom helicopter has produced, as of 2007, approximately 1,200 aircraft.

The company produces three models, the F-28, the more aerodynamic 280 and the turbine-powered 480, each with their own variants. The F-28 and 280 both use Lycoming piston engines, virtually identical to those found in general aviation fixed-wing aircraft.

== Variants ==
=== F-28 ===
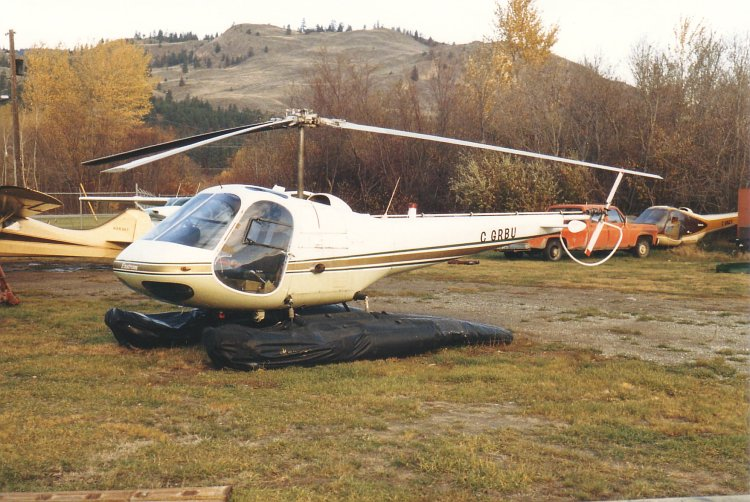
An Enstrom F-28C on inflatable floats, 1986

F-28
Initial production version, powered by 195 hp (145 kW) Lycoming HIO-360-A1A or A1B engine. Certified April 1965. 13 built.
F-28A
Improved version with modified gearing to increase effective power to 205 hp (153 kW). Certified May 1968. 316 built.
T-28
Experimental turbine powered variant. One 220 shp (160 kW) Garrett AiResearch TSE 36-1 engine.
F-28B
Experimental version of F-28 with turbocharged engine.
F-28C
Fitted with a 205 hp (153 kW) turbocharged Lycoming HIO-360-E1AD or HIO-360-E1BD engine. Increased gross weight and tail rotor moved from starboard to port side. Certified December 1975. 177 built.
F-28F Falcon
Similar to F-28C with 225 hp (168 kW) HIO-360-F1AD engine, improved turbocharger and addition of a throttle correlator. Certified December 1980. 132 built.
F-27F-P
Police patrol version.
Spitfire Mark I
A turbine powered derivative powered by 420 shp (310 kW) Allison 250-C20B engine, built by Spitfire Helicopters Inc. One built.
Spitfire Mark II Tigershark
Further stretched and more powerful derivative of Spitfire I. One built.A turbine powered conversion by Spitfire Helicopters Inc.

=== 280 ===
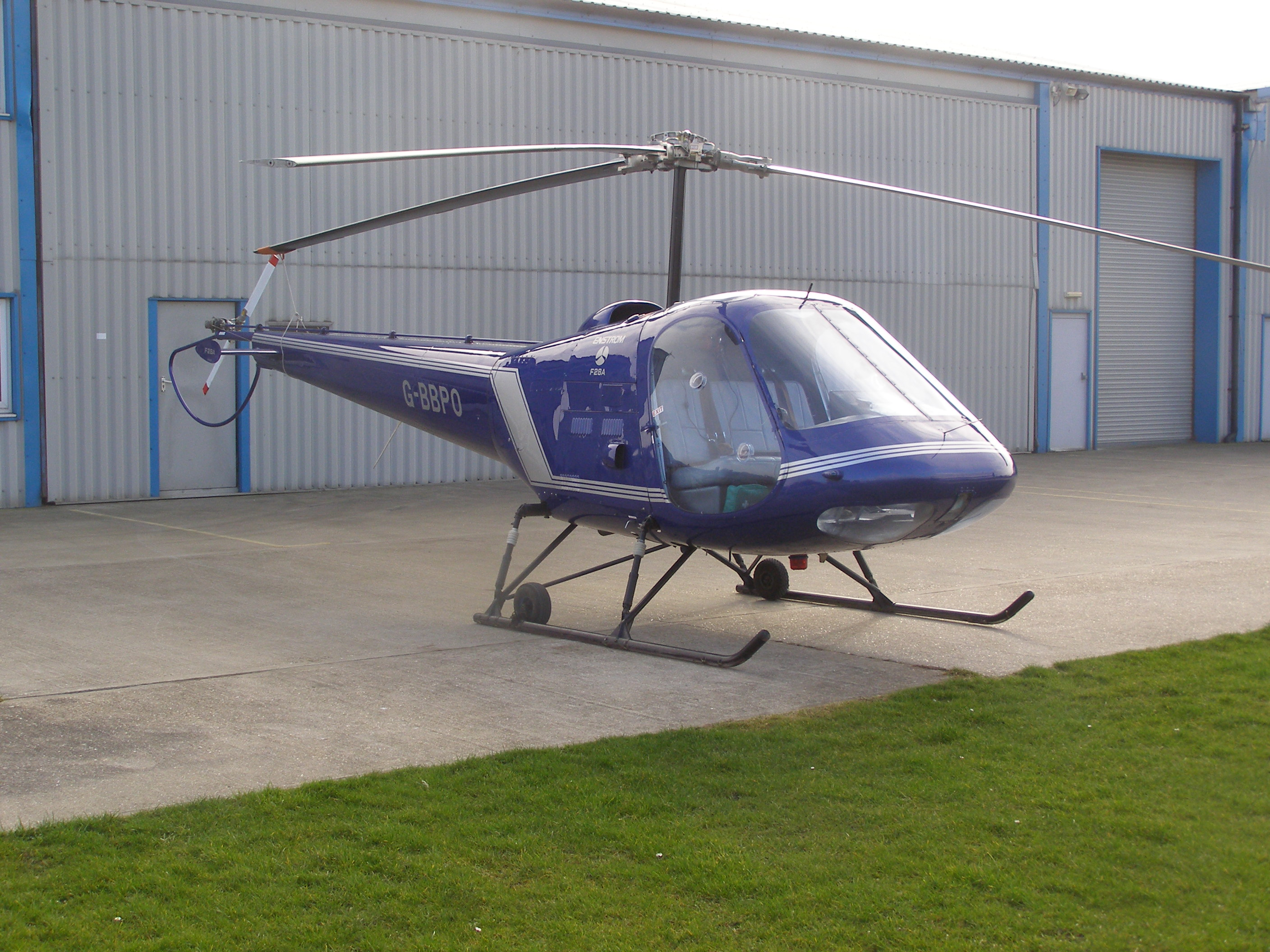
1973 model F-28A

280 Shark
Streamlined fuselage shape, powered by 205 hp (153 kW) HIO-360-C1A or HIO-360-C1B engine. Certified September 1974. 21 built.
280C Shark
Shark with turbocharged engine and revised tail rotor of F-28C. Aerodynamically refined version of the F28C-2, equipped with an upgraded engine, fitted with a turbocharger. Certified December 1975. 6 built.
280L Hawk
Stretched cabin four-seat version, with 225 hp (168 kW) HIO-360-F1AD engine, first flying in December 1968. Two built. Development halted due to lack of funds.
280F
Similar to 280C with modifications of F-28F. Certified December 1980. 132 built as of 1998
280FX
Based on the 280F with landing gear fairings, redesigned air intakes on top of the cabin and a redesigned and relocated horizontal stabilizer with vertical end plates. Certified in January 1985. 80 built as of 1998.

== Operators ==
=== Civil operators ===
The aircraft is operated by a large number of small commercial and flight training operators, most operating one or two aircraft.

=== Military and government operators ===
Chile

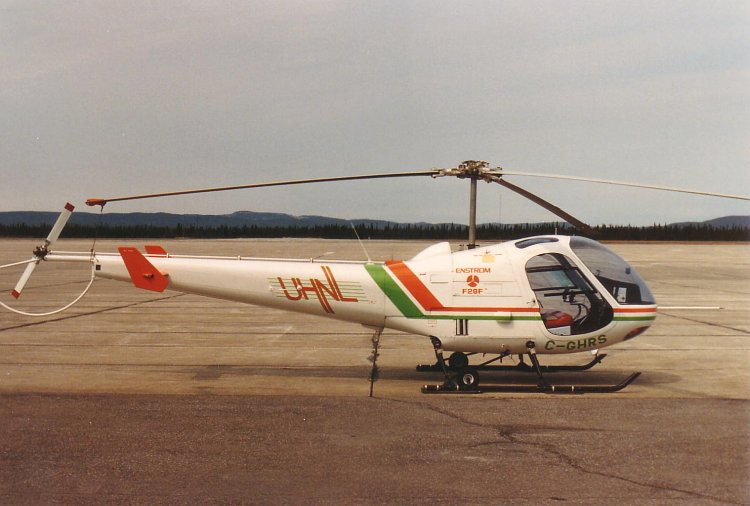
Enstrom F-28F used by Universal Helicopters of Newfoundland and Labrador for training, 1988

- Chilean Army

Colombia

- Colombian Air Force - 12 F-28F trainers delivered 1994.

Peru

- Peruvian Air Force
- Peruvian Army
- Peruvian Naval Aviation

Pakistan

- Pakistan Army Aviation Corp

United States

- Pasadena Police Department

Venezuela

- Venezuelan Air Force

== Accidents and incidents ==
- On 22 October 1986, an Enstrom F-28F Falcon suffered a mechanical failure at an altitude of 75 feet (23 meters) over Manhattan in New York City due to the installation of an improper clutch, struck a fence, and crashed into the Hudson River during a traffic report by WNBC 660 AM radio flying traffic reporter Jane Dornacker. The broadcast captured her shouting "Hit the water! Hit the water! Hit the water!" as the helicopter went down. The pilot survived with serious injuries, but Dornacker died on the way to the hospital.
- On 26 January 2015, an Enstrom 280FX crashed at Erie, Colorado, following the separation of its main rotor blades, killing both the student and instructor on board. The accident was caused by a failure of the main rotor spindle as a result of a crack. The accident resulted in the issuance of an Emergency Airworthiness Directive (AD) by the United States Federal Aviation Administration on 12 February 2015 grounding more than 300 helicopters. The AD requires a magnetic particle inspection to detect cracks in the main rotor spindle in aircraft with more than 5,000 hours and requires replacing the spindle if cracked.
- On 1 December 2023 an Enstrom 280FX crashed into a car on a Madrid motorway, leaving three people injured.
- On 28 December 2025, a midair collision occurred between an Enstrom F-28A helicopter and Enstrom 280C helicopter over Hammonton Municipal Airport in New Jersey. Only the pilots were on board each aircraft.

== Specifications (F28F) ==
Data from Brassey's World Aircraft & Systems Directory

General characteristics

- Crew: one
- Capacity: two passengers
- Length: 29 ft 3 in (8.92 m)
- Height: 9 ft 0 in (2.74 m)
- Empty weight: 1,570 lb (712 kg)
- Max takeoff weight: 2,600 lb (1,179 kg)
- Powerplant: 1 × Lycoming HIO-360-F1AD four-cylinder, direct-drive, horizontally opposed, air-cooled, piston aircraft engine, 225 hp (168 kW)
- Main rotor diameter: 32 ft 0 in (9.75 m)
- Main rotor area: 804 sq ft (74.7 m^{2}) NACA 0013.5

Performance

- Maximum speed: 97 kn (112 mph, 180 km/h)
- Cruise speed: 89 kn (102 mph, 165 km/h) (econ cruise)
- Range: 241 nmi (277 mi, 446 km)
- Endurance: 3 hr 30 min
- Service ceiling: 12,000 ft (3,700 m)
- Rate of climb: 1,450 ft/min (7.4 m/s)

== See also ==
Related development

- Enstrom TH180
- Enstrom 480
- Spitfire Mark I

Aircraft of comparable role, configuration, and era

- Brantly B-2
- Robinson R22
- Robinson R44
- Schweizer 300C

== Bibliography ==
- "Type Certificate Sheet No. H1CE, Revision 43". Federal Aviation Administration. October 1, 2024.
- Elliott, Bryn (May–June 1999). "On the Beat: The First 60 Years of Britain's Air Police, Part Two". Air Enthusiast. No. 81. pp. 64–69. ISSN 0143-5450.
- Foster, Peter R. (Autumn 1997). "Air Power Analysis: Part One: Columbia, Ecuador, French Guyana, Guyana, Peru, Surinam and Venezuela". World Air Power Journal. Vol. 30. pp. 132–157. ISBN 1-86184-004-7. ISSN 0959-7050.
- Simpson, R. W. (1998). Airlife's Helicopters and Rotorcraft. Shrewsbury, UK: Airlide Publishing Ltd. ISBN 1-85310-968-1.
- Taylor, M. J. H., ed. (1999). Brassey's World Aircraft & Systems Directory 1999/2000 Edition. London: Brassey's. ISBN 1-85753-245-7.
