= Spitfire Mark II Tigershark =

Mark II Tigershark

General information
- Type: utility helicopter
- National origin: United States
- Manufacturer: Spitfire Helicopters Inc.

History
- First flight: February 1979
- Developed from: Enstrom F-28, Spitfire Mark I

The Spitfire Mark II, later given the name Tigershark, was a utility helicopter built in the United States in the late 1970s and intended for series production. It was a further evolution of the Spitfire Mark I design, a turbine-powered conversion of the Enstrom F-28. Although airframe changes on the Mark I had been minimal, the Mark II had a substantially redesigned fuselage that rearranged the F-28's 2+2 seating to move the pilot's seat forward in the nose by itself and add a bench seat for three passengers abreast behind it. The leftmost seat on the bench could be fitted with dual controls. The fuselage was lengthened, and the powerplant installation (the same Allison 250 used on the Mark I) was mounted well to the rear. The Mark II still used the dynamic components of the F-28, plus some of its airframe.

Spitfire displayed a mockup of the Mark II at the Helicopter Association of America meeting in Anaheim, California in February 1977. The prototype first flew in February 1979 and by July that year, the company reported that it had sold 42 examples of the Mark I and Mark II and expected to build 60 aircraft during 1980.

However, Spitfire remained dependent on Enstrom to supply airframes for remanufacture, and Enstrom distanced itself from the project somewhat. Competing plans by Enstrom and Spitfire to market Polish-built Mil Mi-2 helicopters in the United States might have contributed to the friction. In Spitfire's version of the deal, Polish manufacturer PZL-Świdnik (represented by its trade bureau Pezetel) would also contribute to the Spitfire manufacturing efforts. By November 1979, Enstrom refused to supply airframes to Spitfire.

The situation improved somewhat in the 1980s, and Spitfire president Jack Fetsko reported in May 1983 that relations with Enstrom were at the point where the two companies could "talk programs". By that time, costs for the Mark II, now dubbed the Tigershark, had increased from $185,000 expected in 1979 to $305,000 but Spitfire had a firm sale for the first production aircraft. Together with companies Sodian and Soprea, Spitfire formed a new venture, Spitfire Helicopters International, to manufacture the Mark I and Mark II in Málaga, Spain.

Nothing came of the joint venture, and Spitfire's attempts to market F-28 derivatives came to an end.

== Specifications ==
Data from Lambert 1979, p.1580

General characteristics

- Crew: one pilot
- Capacity: three passengers
- Length: 30 ft 6 in (9.29 m)
- Height: 9 ft 2 in (2.79 m)
- Empty weight: 1,325 lb (602 kg)
- Gross weight: 2,500 lb (1,136 kg)
- Powerplant: 1 × Allison 250-C20B , 420 hp (313 kW)
- Main rotor diameter: 32 ft 0 in (9.75 m)
- Main rotor area: 804 sq ft (74.7 m^{2})

Performance

- Maximum speed: 135 mph (217 km/h, 117 kn)
- Cruise speed: 120 mph (192 km/h, 100 kn)
- Range: 450 mi (724 km, 390 nmi)
- Service ceiling: 13,400 ft (4,090 m)

== See also ==
- PZL Kania (proposed Spitfire Taurus II)
