= Spitfire Mark I =

American light helicopter

Mark I

General information
- Type: utility helicopter
- National origin: United States
- Manufacturer: Spitfire Helicopters Inc.

History
- First flight: December 1978
- Developed from: Enstrom F-28

The Spitfire Mark I was a utility helicopter built in the United States in the late 1970s and intended for series production. In essence, the Mark I was an Enstrom F-28 that was modified to use an Allison 250 turboshaft engine and geared transmission in place of the original piston engine and system of vee belts. The resulting powerplant installation was lighter and more compact, which allowed for additional cargo or fuel.

Spitfire Helicopters' parent company, Fetsko Aviation Sales and Transportation began work on the prototype in January 1976, and on a number of pre-production aircraft in February 1977. Fetsko displayed a mockup of the concept at the National Maintenance and Operations Meeting at Reading, Pennsylvania in June 1976.

The prototype (registered N4890) first flew in December 1978. By May 1979, Spitfire had supplemental approval for the turbine conversion and by July, the company reported that it had sold 42 examples of the Mark I and Mark II and expected to build 60 aircraft during 1980. The engine installation on production models was to be slightly further forward than on the prototype.

However, Spitfire remained dependent on Enstrom to supply airframes for remanufacture, and Enstrom distanced itself from the project somewhat. Competing plans by Enstrom and Spitfire to market Polish-built Mil Mi-2 helicopters in the United States might have contributed to the friction. In Spitfire's version of the deal, Polish manufacturer PZL-Świdnik would also contribute to the Spitfire manufacturing efforts. By November 1979, Enstrom refused to supply airframes to Spitfire.

The situation improved somewhat in the 1980s, and Spitfire president Jack Fetsko reported in May 1983 that relations with Enstrom had improved to the point where the two companies could "talk programs". By that time, costs had increased from $US 165,000 expected in 1979 to $US 285,000 but Spitfire had taken deposits for 50 Mark Is, and had a firm sale for the first production aircraft. Together with companies Sodian and Soprea, Spitfire formed a new venture, Spitfire Helicopters International, to manufacture the Mark I and Mark II in Málaga, Spain.

Nothing came of the joint venture, and Spitfire's attempts to market F-28 derivatives came to an end. In the 1990s, Enstrom marketed its own turbine-powered version of the F-28 as the Enstrom 480.

== Specifications ==
Data from Taylor 1977, p.411

General characteristics

- Crew: one pilot
- Capacity: two passengers
- Length: 29 ft 5 in (8.96 m)
- Height: 9 ft 2 in (2.79 m)
- Empty weight: 1,250 lb (567 kg)
- Gross weight: 2,300 lb (1,043 kg)
- Powerplant: 1 × Allison 250-C20B , 420 hp (313 kW)
- Main rotor diameter: 32 ft 0 in (9.75 m)
- Main rotor area: 804 sq ft (74.7 m^{2})

Performance

- Maximum speed: 129 mph (208 km/h, 112 kn)
- Range: 450 mi (724 km, 390 nmi)
- Service ceiling: 15,000 ft (4,570 m)
