= Enstrom 480 =

American small helicopter design

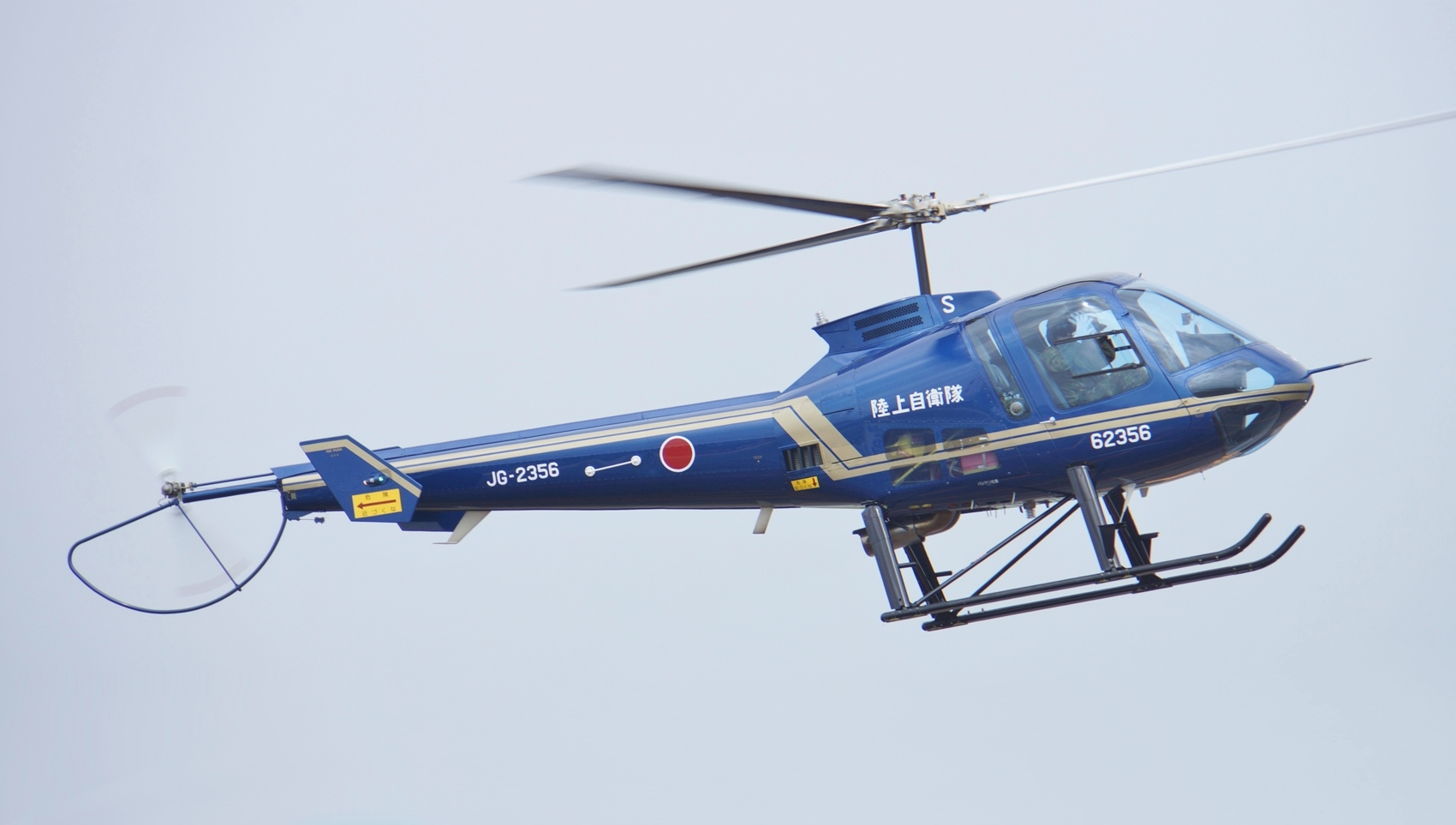
- A Enstrom 480 of the JGSDF

General information
- Type: Light helicopter
- Manufacturer: Enstrom Helicopter Corporation
- Number built: 142 (as of July 2011)

History
- Manufactured: 1993–present
- Introduction date: 1993
- First flight: 7 October 1989
- Developed from: Enstrom 280

The Enstrom 480 is a light helicopter produced by the Enstrom Helicopter Corporation.

== Design and development ==
In the 1980s the Enstrom Helicopter Company was producing two helicopters, both powered by horizontally opposed piston engines. When the United States Army revealed a requirement for a turbine-powered training helicopter, the company designed a larger, turbine-powered version of its 280 Shark. The proposed unit was designated TH28 (TH for "training helicopter" derived from the 28(0), since the Army's proposal was NTH, "new training helicopter").

The Army contract effort was not successful, but the company effort looked promising enough that management committed to continue with a commercial version, which was introduced in 1993. Its power was provided by the C20W variant of the Rolls-Royce Model 250 turboshaft engine.

== Design ==
The 480 fuselage consists of a welded steel-tube framework with aluminum cover and tailcone. The pilot controls the aircraft from the left seat, which is unusual for helicopters. The aircraft does not have a hydraulic system; a trim system absorbs rotor feedback and allows the pilot to position the desired stick setting. The 480B engine is capable of producing 420 shp, but in this application it is derated to 305 shp for 5 minutes and 277 continuous shp, which is available to 13,000 MSL on a standard day. Thus hot-temperature or high-altitude operations have a considerable degree of power available. The engine drives a three-bladed rotor of 32 feet diameter and a tail rotor of 5 feet diameter. The main rotor and hubs weigh a total of 300 pounds, so there is considerable inertia in the system during a loss of power. Autorotation landings are uneventful.

== Variants ==
480
Five-seat civil version based on the Enstrom TH-28, certified in November 1993.

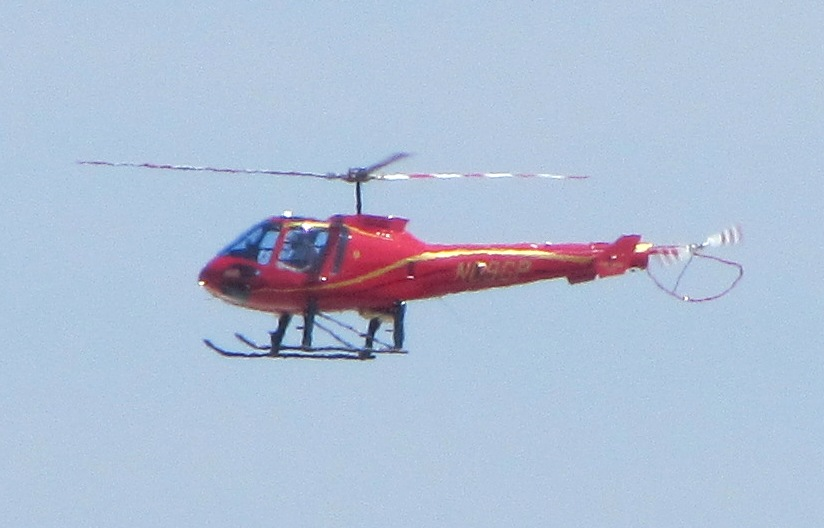
Enstrom 480B in flight

480B
Enhanced and with increased gross weight (3000 lb) and power limits, certified in February 2001 in the US. and in February 2019 in Canada. The gross weight and useful load were increased by approximately 150 pounds.
480B Guardian
480B configured for police or law enforcement operations, fitted with a front-mounted camera and searchlight.
TH-28
Based on the Enstrom 280FX with a turbine engine, a larger cabin and larger horizontal and vertical stabilizers. Certified in September 1992 Military training, light patrol version, six built.

== Operators ==
=== Civil operators ===
The aircraft is operated by a large number of small commercial and flight training operators, most operating one or two aircraft.

=== Military and government operators ===
Czech Republic

- Flight Training Center Pardubice

Equatorial Guinea

- Military of Equatorial Guinea

Indonesia

- Indonesian National Police

Japan

- Japan Ground Self-Defense Force

Thailand

- Royal Thai Army

Venezuela

- Venezuelan Air Force

Zambia

- Zambian Air Force - 2 helicopters

=== Former operators ===
Canada

- York Regional Police 2000-2002. One aircraft, retired due to excessive noise.

Estonia

- Police and Border Guard Aviation Group

== Specifications (480) ==
Data from The International Directory of Civil Aircraft, 2003–2004

General characteristics

- Crew: one
- Capacity: four passengers
- Length: 29 ft 10 in (9.09 m)
- Height: 9 ft 7 in (2.92 m)
- Empty weight: 1,675 lb (760 kg)
- Gross weight: 2,850 lb (1,293 kg)
- Powerplant: 1 × Rolls-Royce Model 250-C20W turboshaft , 285 hp (215 kW)
- Main rotor diameter: 32 ft 0 in (9.75 m)
- Main rotor area: 804 sq ft (74.7 m^{2})

Performance

- Cruise speed: 131 mph (211 km/h, 114 kn)
- Range: 435 mi (700 km, 378 nmi)
- Service ceiling: 13,000 ft (3,962 m)
- Rate of climb: 1,500 ft/min (7.62 m/s)

== See also ==
Related development

- Enstrom F-28
- Enstrom 280

Aircraft of comparable role, configuration, and era

- Robinson R66
- Schweizer S-333
- Schweizer S-434
