= Rolls-Royce =

List of articles associated with the British automobile and engine manufacturer

Rolls-Royce may refer to:

- Rolls-Royce Limited, a British manufacturer of cars and later aircraft engines, founded in 1906, now defunct
- Rolls-Royce Motors, owner of the former car division incorporated in 1973 and folded in 1998
- Rolls-Royce Motor Cars, the current car manufacturing company incorporated in 1998, a subsidiary of BMW Group
- Rolls-Royce Holdings plc, an aerospace, power systems and defence company and Rolls-Royce's current principal operating company
  - Rolls-Royce Controls and Data Services
  - Rolls-Royce Deutschland
    - Rolls-Royce Power Systems
  - Rolls-Royce North America
  - Rolls-Royce Submarines
  - Rolls-Royce Turbomeca

== See also ==
- List of Rolls-Royce motor cars
- Rose Royce, an American soul and R&B group
- Roll (disambiguation)
- Royce (disambiguation)
