= RotorWay Scorpion =

Line of helicopters

Scorpion
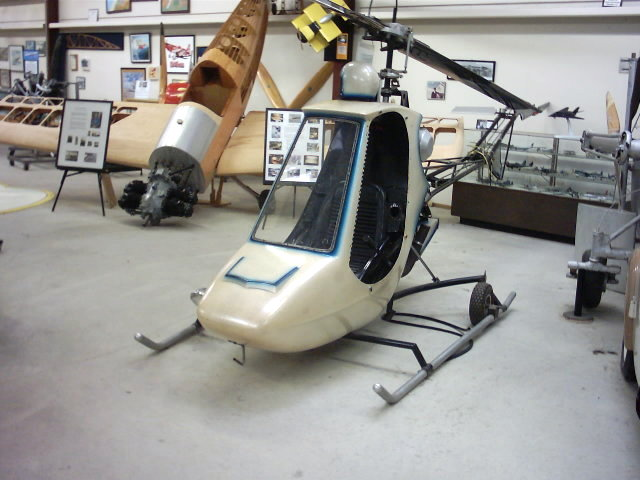

General information
- Type: kit helicopter
- Manufacturer: Rotorway
- Designer: B.J. Schramm

History
- Manufactured: 1968-1984
- First flight: 1966

The RotorWay Scorpion is a family of helicopters manufactured by RotorWay International.

== Design and development ==
Derived from an original design by B.J. Schramm, the Schramm Javelin evolved into the Schramm Scorpion, both of which were developed by the Schramm Aircraft Company. A new company, RotorWay Aircraft Inc., was formed to market and produce plans and kits for the Scorpion, described as a production version of the earlier Javelin. Production of kits started in 1967 with the original Scorpion model, and ended with the discontinuation of the Scorpion 145 in 1984.

== Scorpion ==
The Scorpion prototype was built in 1966, followed by the production of Scorpion kits in 1968.

- Gross Weight: about 700 lb (318 kg)
- Useful Load: 425 lb (193 kg)
- Range: 160 miles (257 km)
- Cruise Speed: 65 mph (105 km/h)
- Rate of Climb: 900 ft/min at sea level

== Scorpion Too ==
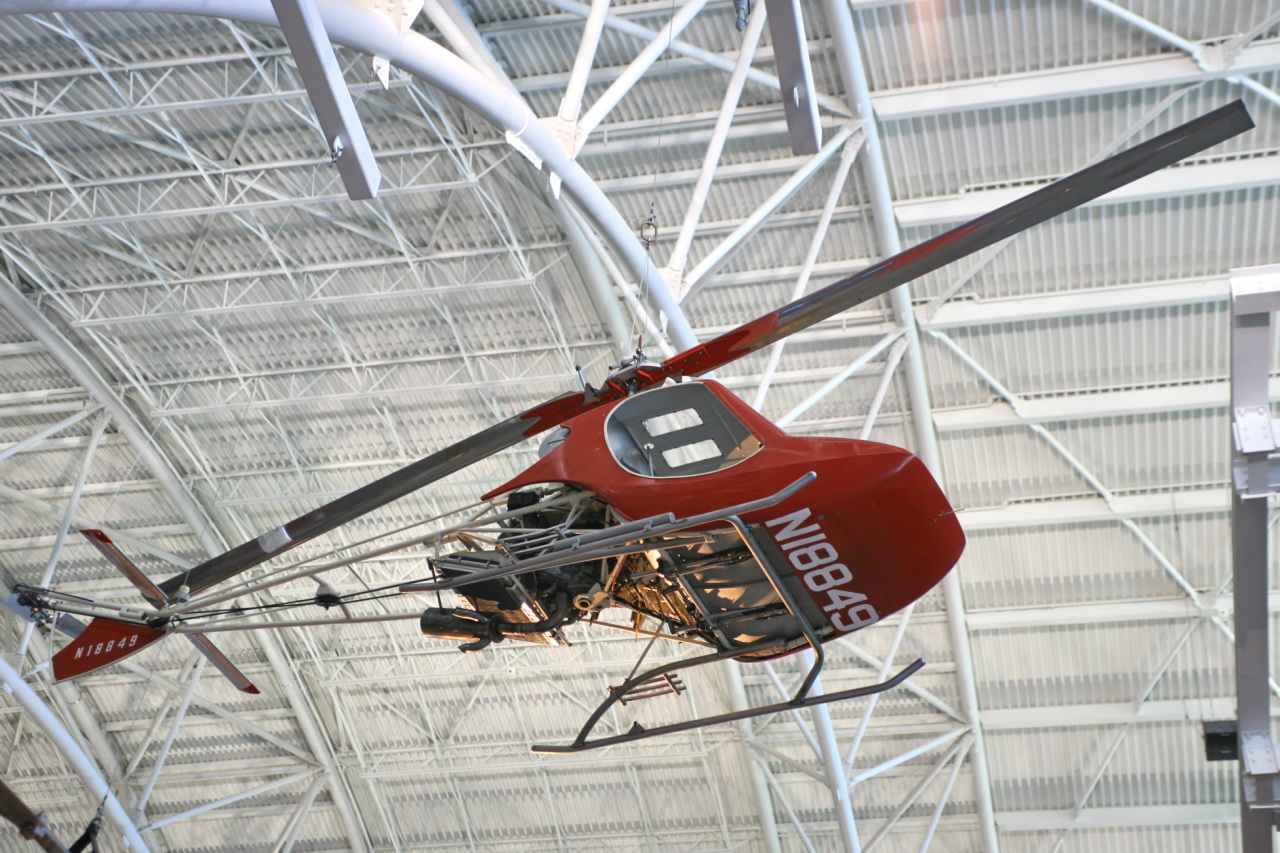
The RotorWay Scorpion Too at the Steven F. Udvar-Hazy Center.

The Scorpion Too, or Scorpion II, was the first two-seater manufactured by RotorWay. It took about 2,000 hours to complete.

- Gross weight: 1,125 lb (510 kg)
- Useful load: 435 lb (197 kg)
- Range: 125 miles (201 km)
- Cruise speed: 75 mph (121 km/h)
- Rate of climb: 1,000 ft/min at sea level

== Scorpion 133 ==
Introduced in 1976, the Scorpion 133 was no different from the Scorpion Too, except for the new RW133 engine installed. This engine, the first built by RotorWay, was a 4-cylinder, 4-cycle, 133 horsepower (99 kW) engine. In 1977, because of the increased engine power, the length of the Scorpion's blades increased, from 24 feet (7.3 m) to 25 feet (7.6 m).

- Gross Weight: 1,235 lb (560 kg)
- Useful Load: 420 lb (191 kg)
- Range: 130 nmi (240 km) with one person, 79 nmi (146 km) with two people
- Cruise Speed: 80 mph (129 km/h)
- Rate of Climb: 800 ft/min

== Scorpion 145 ==
Produced briefly in 1984, the Scorpion 145 mounted the RW145 engine developed by RotorWay.

== Specifications (Scorpion Too) ==
Data from Jane's All The World's Aircraft 1976-77

General characteristics

- Crew: 2
- Length: 20 ft 3.5 in (6.18 m)
- Wingspan: 24 ft 0 in (7.32 m)
- Height: 7 ft 3.5 in (2.22 m)
- Airfoil: NACA 0015
- Empty weight: 750 lb (340 kg)
- Max takeoff weight: 1,200 lb (544 kg)
- Powerplant: 1 × RotorWay RW133 4-cylinder horizontally opposed liquid-cooled piston engine, 133 hp (99 kW)
- Main rotor area: 452 sq ft (42.1 m^{2}) two blade semi-rigid rotor

Performance

- Cruise speed: 78 kn (90 mph, 145 km/h)
- Range: 104 nmi (120 mi, 193 km)
- Ferry range: 156 nmi (180 mi, 290 km) auxiliary fuel
- Service ceiling: 10,000 ft (3,050 m)
- Rate of climb: 800 ft/min (4.1 m/s)
- Wing loading: 2.65 lb/sq ft (12.9 kg/m^{2})
- Hovering ceiling (in ground effect): 5,500 ft (1,375 m)

== See also ==
- RotorWay Exec
- Homebuilt aircraft
