= Rolls-Royce Holdings =

British multinational aerospace and defence company

Rolls-Royce Holdings plc
- Trade name: Rolls-Royce
- Type: Public
- Traded as: LSE: RR. FTSE 100 Component
- ISIN: GB00B63H8491
- Industry: Aerospace, Defence, Energy, Marine
- Predecessor: Rolls-Royce plc
- Founded: Partnership: 23 December 1904; 121 years ago; Business: 15 March 1906; 120 years ago; Current company: 10 February 2011; 15 years ago
- Founder: Charles Rolls and Henry Royce (as Rolls-Royce Limited)
- Headquarters: Kings Place, London, England, U.K.
- Key people: Anita Frew (chair); Tufan Erginbilgic (CEO)
- Revenue: ▲£21,207 million (2025)
- Operating income: ▲£4,468 million (2025)
- Net income: ▲£5,836 million (2025)
- Total assets: ▲£38,115 million (2025)
- Total equity: ▲£2,753 million (2025)
- Number of employees: 50,000 (2025)
- Subsidiaries: Rolls-Royce Controls and Data Services; Rolls-Royce Deutschland; Rolls-Royce North America; Rolls-Royce India; Rolls-Royce Power Systems; Rolls-Royce SMR; Rolls-Royce Submarines; Vinters Engineering; Rolls-Royce Turbomeca (50%); MTU Turbomeca Rolls-Royce (33%)
- Website: rolls-royce.com

Rolls-Royce Holdings plc is a British multinational aerospace and defence company incorporated in February 2011. The company owns Rolls-Royce, a business established in 1904 which today designs, manufactures and distributes power systems for aviation and other industries. Rolls-Royce is one of the world's largest manufacturers of aircraft engines and has major businesses in the marine propulsion and energy sectors.

Rolls-Royce was the world's 16th largest defence contractor in 2018 when measured by defence revenues. The company is also the world's fourth largest commercial aircraft engine manufacturer, with a 12% market share as of 2020.

Rolls-Royce Holdings plc is listed on the London Stock Exchange, where it is a constituent of the FTSE 100 Index. At the close of London trading on 11 February 2025, the company had a market capitalisation of £52.66bn, the 11th-largest of any company with a primary listing on the London Stock Exchange.

The company's registered office is at Kings Place, near Kings Cross in London.

== History ==
=== Ownership ===
Rolls-Royce grew from the engineering business of Henry Royce, which was established in 1884 and ten years later began to manufacture dynamos and electric cranes. Charles Rolls established a separate business with Royce in 1904 because Royce had developed a range of cars which Rolls wanted to sell. A corporate owner was incorporated in 1906 with the name Rolls-Royce Limited.

In 1971 the same company, Rolls-Royce Limited, entered voluntary liquidation because it was unable to meet its financial obligations. It remains in existence today, still in liquidation. Its business and assets were bought by the government using a company created for the purpose named Rolls-Royce (1971) Limited. Rolls-Royce Motors was separated out in 1973. Rolls-Royce (1971) Limited currently carries on the business under the name Rolls-Royce plc.

Rolls-Royce plc returned to the stock market in 1987 under the government of Margaret Thatcher. In 2003 ownership of Rolls-Royce plc was passed to Rolls-Royce Group plc. In the same way, Rolls-Royce Group plc passed ownership on 23 May 2011 to Rolls-Royce Holdings plc. Throughout these corporate changes Rolls-Royce plc has remained the principal trading company. (Note: Companies with shares available to the general public: 1906 company, Rolls-Royce Limited. Its shares became more or less valueless in 1971 and their price sank as low as a penny from a high of £1.25.; By the time the liquidation was effectively complete those shareholders had received more than £0.60 per share from the liquidation and they may have bought them for around a penny.: 1971 company, floated as Rolls-Royce plc still owns the principal business but itself was sold to the new holding company in 2003; 2003 company floated as Rolls-Royce Group plc bought the 1971 company; 2011 company floated as Rolls-Royce Holdings plc bought the 1971 company from the 2003 company)

=== Growth ===
The 1980s saw the introduction of a policy to offer an engine fitment on a much wider range of civil aircraft types, with the company's engines now powering 17 different airliners (and their variants) compared to General Electric's 14 and Pratt & Whitney's 10.

The civil engines business represents the company's main area of growth. Between 2010 and 2018, Rolls-Royce invested £11 billion in facilities and R&D and launched six new civil engines including the Trent XWB and the Pearl 15 for the business aviation market. It secured orders for 2,700 engines for wide-body aircraft and business jets. It expects to produce over 600 wide-body engines a year and should power over half of the world's wide-body fleet within a few years, up from 22% a decade before.

In 2023, Rolls-Royce entered into an agreement for $3.52 million of funding with the UK Space Agency for the creation of a nuclear reactor on the moon. The project is intended to provide power for space missions.

=== Restructuring ===
In 2014 and 2015, Rolls-Royce issued at least four profit warnings due to US defence cuts, a downturn in the offshore oil and gas market and its civil aerospace business, the company initiated job cuts of over 3,000 in response. Rolls-Royce had been selling many of its aero-engines in combination with long-term service contracts. Even though the company booked profits in part with the delivery of the engine, actual payments only came in over time. Between 2003 and 2015, it sold a majority of its engines with these “TotalCare” contracts. The company announced it would no longer be able to move its revenues forward from its long-term service contracts to compensate for its contracts being unprofitable in the early stages after the introduction of IFRS 15 in 2018 and its profits for 2015 would have been £900m lower than the £1.4bn it reported if it had followed the new accounting standard.

In February 2017, Rolls-Royce posted its largest ever pre-tax loss of £4.6 billion; This included a £4.4 billion writedown on financial hedges that the company uses to protect itself against currency fluctuations, and a £671 million penalty to settle bribery and corruption charges with the Serious Fraud Office (SFO), the US Department of Justice, and Brazilian authorities.

On 14 June 2018, the company announced a restructuring of the business to create three simpler decentralised units (civil aerospace, defence and power systems), to rationalise back office functions and to remove middle management functions. The cost savings should amount to £400 million per year by 2020, with an up-front restructuring cost of £500 million. Some 4,600 people are likely to leave the business out of 55,000 employed worldwide, 3,000 job losses from the UK and the rest from elsewhere in the world (15,700 of the employees work in Derby and 10,300 work elsewhere in the United Kingdom).

In August 2018, Rolls-Royce announced it was taking a charge of £554 million to cover faults with some Trent 1000 engines on Boeing 787 Dreamliners. Rather than going thousands of hours between inspections, the faults with turbine blades mean the engines currently require inspection every 300 hours of flight. In the same announcement Rolls-Royce, said it would spend £450m fixing faults on the Trent 1000 in 2018, £450m in 2019 and £350m in 2020, with the work complete by 2022.

In May 2020, the company announced its intention to cut 20% of its workforce (approximately 9,000 staff) worldwide as a result of the COVID-19 pandemic. Around 3,000 job losses were expected in the UK, half of them in Derby.

In February 2021, Rolls-Royce started talks concerning an operational shutdown of its civil aerospace unit that might last for two weeks due to the impact of Covid-19 and its restrictions.

Rolls-Royce announced, in October 2023, that it would cut 2,500 jobs, or 6 per cent of its total workforce.

Under CEO Tufan Erginbilgiç Rolls Royce has seen a remarkable turnaround. In July 2025 the share price hit £11 for the first time, from £1 three years ago. Rolls Royce is now the fifth largest company in the FTSE 100 index, valued at £90 billion. Midterm 2027 targets for operating profit were hit two years ahead of estimates, and a jump from £2.6-2.9 billion in 2025 to £3.6-£3.9 billion in 2028 is projected in terms of operating profit per annum. In July the estimates for operating profit for full year 2025 were uprated by £300 million.

== Senior leadership ==
- Chairman: Anita Frew (since October 2021)
- Chief Executive: Tufan Erginbilgic (since January 2023)

=== List of former chairmen ===
1. Sir Simon Robertson (2011–2013)
2. Sir Ian Davis (2013–2021)

=== List of former chief executives ===
1. John Rishton (2011–2015)
2. Warren East (2013–2022)

== Facilities ==
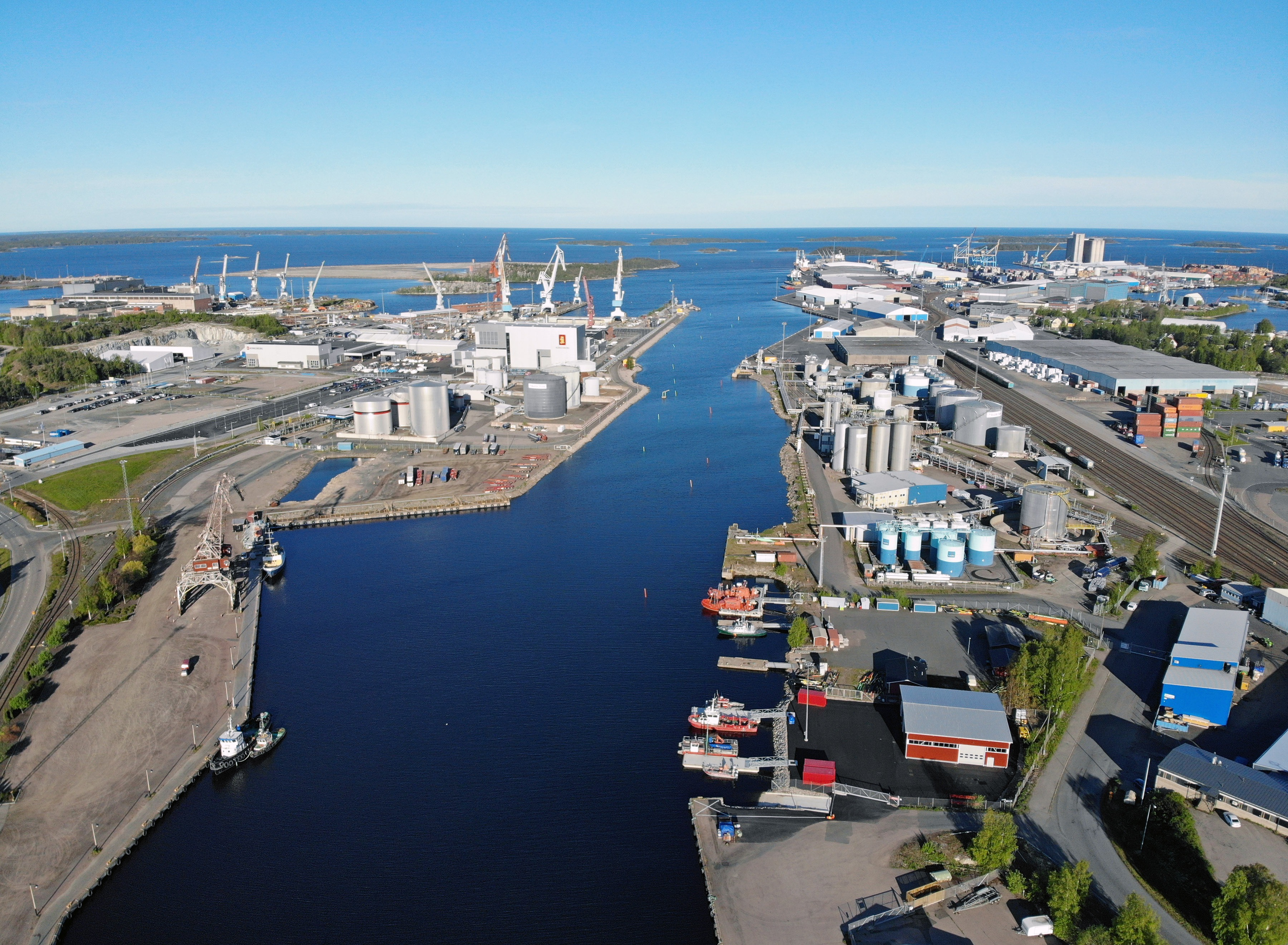
STX Europe dockyard where the Rolls-Royce plant is located at Rauma, Finland

=== Testing ===
Rolls-Royce's £90 million Testbed 80 in Derby is the largest of its kind, sized for engines of up to 140,000 lbf (620 kN) of thrust. Design started in 2017, construction began in 2018 and it was officially opened in 2021. The 80,730 sq ft (7,500 m^{2}) facility is 426.5 ft (130.0 m) long, has a 95 ft (29 m) tall intake tower and a 123 ft (37 m) tall exhaust stack. Built from 3,450 tons of steel and 27,000 m^{3} (950,000 cu ft) of concrete, it has a 49 by 49 ft (15 by 15 m) tall and wide enclosed space and it can handle a 66 tons engine including its carrier. The company completed its first engine run on the new test bed in July 2024.

X-ray imaging allows to visualize the position of seals and clearances in real time while an engine is running. While it was retrofitted on Rolls' test bed 57, test bed 80 is the first to be purpose-designed for industrial radiography. To protect from external X-ray, 30 cm (11.8 in.) of lead, double walls are up to 8.9 ft. (2.7 m) thick (a 5.6-ft. interior wall and 3.3-ft. exterior wall) and provide acoustic insulation. Canadian prime contractor MDS Aero Support is responsible for design and management, test systems supply, engine adapters, support systems and data acquisition and control while construction is done by Buckingham Group Contracting.

== Acquisitions ==
Northern Engineering Industries / broken up and sold

In 1988, Rolls-Royce acquired Northern Engineering Industries (NEI), based in the North East of England, a group of heavy engineering companies mainly associated with electrical generation and power management. The group included Clarke Chapman (cranes), Reyrolle (now part of Siemens) and Parsons (now part of Siemens steam turbines). The company was renamed Rolls-Royce Industrial Power Group. It was sold off piecemeal over the next decade as the company re-focused on its core aero-engine operations following the recession of the early 1990s.

Allison Engine Company

On 21 November 1994, Rolls-Royce announced it had agreed terms to acquire the Allison Engine Company, an American manufacturer of gas turbines and components for aviation, industrial and marine engines. The two companies had a technical association dating back to the Second World War. Rolls-Royce had previously tried to buy the company when General Motors sold it in 1993, but GM opted for a management buyout instead for $370 million. Owing to Allison's involvement in classified and export restricted technology, the 1994 acquisition was subject to investigation to determine the national security implications. On 27 March 1995, the US Department of Defense announced that the "deal between Allison Engine Co. and Rolls-Royce does not endanger national security." Rolls-Royce was, however, obliged to set up a proxy board to manage Allison and had also to set up a separate company, Allison Advanced Development Company, Inc., to manage classified programmes "that involve leading-edge technologies" such as the Joint Strike Fighter programme. In 2000, this restriction was replaced by a more flexible Special Security Arrangement. In 2001, Rolls-Royce and its LiftSystem was among the group that won the JSF contract for the F-35.

The Allison acquisition, at $525 million, brought four new engine types into the Rolls-Royce civil engine portfolio on seven platforms and several light aircraft applications. Allison is now known as Rolls-Royce North America.

Vickers/Vinters

In 1999 Rolls-Royce acquired Vickers plc for its marine businesses. The portion retained is now Vinters Engineering Limited. Rolls-Royce sold Vickers Defence Systems (the other major Vickers area of business) to Alvis plc in 2002.

BMW joint venture / Rolls-Royce Deutschland

Rolls-Royce has established a leading position in the corporate and regional airline sector through the development of the Tay engine, the Allison acquisition and the consolidation of the BMW Rolls-Royce joint venture. In 1999, BMW Rolls-Royce was renamed Rolls-Royce Deutschland and became a 100% owned subsidiary of Rolls-Royce plc.

SAIC joint venture / Optimized Systems and Solutions

Optimized Systems and Solutions Limited (formerly known as Data Systems & Solutions) was founded in 1999 as a joint venture between Rolls-Royce plc and Science Applications International Corporation (SAIC). In early 2006, SAIC exited the joint venture agreement, making Rolls-Royce plc the sole owner.

Tognum joint venture with Daimler / Rolls-Royce Power Systems Holding GmbH

In March 2011, Rolls-Royce and Daimler launched a $4.2 billion public tender offer for 100 per cent of the share capital of Tognum, the owner of MTU Friedrichshafen – a leading high-speed industrial and marine diesel engine manufacturer, which was completed using a 50:50 joint venture company. Rolls-Royce and Daimler AG intend that the joint venture company, which also now incorporates Rolls-Royce's existing Bergen engine business, is listed on the Frankfurt Stock Exchange.

Aero Engine Controls / Rolls-Royce Controls and Data Services

Following the acquisition of Goodrich by United Technologies Corporation in July 2012, Rolls-Royce announced it would purchase Goodrich's 50% share of Aero Engine Controls to become wholly owned by Rolls-Royce.

At the June 2019 Paris Air Show, Rolls-Royce announced its acquisition of Siemens' electric propulsion branch (while they are partners on the E-Fan X demonstrator), to be completed in late 2019, employing 180 in Germany and Hungary.

== Divestment ==
=== Energy gas turbine and compressor business ===
In May 2014, Rolls-Royce sold its energy gas turbine and compressor business to Siemens for £785 million.

=== Commercial marine business ===
In July 2018, Rolls-Royce sold its commercial marine business to Kongsberg for £500 million.

=== Nuclear services businesses ===
In September 2019, Rolls-Royce agreed to sell its civil nuclear services businesses in the U.S., Canada, Mondragon France, and Gateshead UK to the Westinghouse Electric Company for an undisclosed sum. These businesses had a revenue of $70 million and about 500 employees in 2018. Rolls-Royce is keeping its nuclear new build and small modular reactor (SMR) business in the UK. In November 2020, the company announced plans to build up to 16 Rolls-Royce SMR nuclear plants across the UK, continuing its nuclear division operations. In December 2020 Rolls-Royce announced it would sell other foreign parts of its civil nuclear instrumentation and control business to Framatome as part of its post-COVID recovery plan, completing the deal involving over 550 employees in November 2021.

=== ITP Aero ===
In September 2022, Rolls-Royce sold ITP Aero to American private equity firm Bain Capital, SAPA Placencia and JB Capital for approximately €1.7 billion.

== Major sales ==
Airbus A380

In 1996, Rolls-Royce and Airbus signed a memorandum of understanding, specifying the Trent 900 as the engine of choice for the then A3XX, now the Airbus A380. However, the Engine Alliance GP7000 would ultimately also be offered as an option on the A380.

In October 2006, Rolls-Royce suspended production of its Trent 900 engine because of delays by Airbus on the delivery of the A380 superjumbo. Rolls-Royce announced in October 2007 that production of the Trent 900 had been restarted after a twelve-month suspension caused by delays to the A380.

In 2011, Rolls-Royce faced scrutiny after high profile incidents involving the Trent 900. One of the engines suffered a partial power loss during a Qantas flight in February 2011. This followed an incident in November 2010 in which an engine disintegrated in flight causing Qantas Flight 32 to make an emergency landing in Singapore. The aircraft was extensively damaged and the airline grounded its fleet of A380s. The problem was traced to a fatigue crack in an oil pipe requiring the replacement of some engines and modifications to the design. Trent-powered A380s operated by Lufthansa and Singapore Airlines were also affected. Qantas gradually returned its A380s to service over several months. In June 2011 the airline announced it had agreed to compensation of AU$95m (US$100m) from Rolls-Royce.

On 17 April 2015, it was announced that Rolls-Royce had received its largest order to date worth £6.1bn ($9.2bn) to supply engines for 50 Emirates A380 planes.

Boeing 787

On 6 April 2004, Boeing announced that it had selected both Rolls-Royce and General Electric to power its new 787. Rolls-Royce submitted the Trent 1000, a further development of that series.

Airbus A350XWB

In July 2006, Rolls-Royce reached an agreement to supply a new version of the Trent 1000 for the revised Airbus A350XWB jetliner. As of July 2015, over 1,500 engines of this type have been supplied to 40 customers.

Panavia Tornado, Eurofighter Typhoon and Lightning II

On the military side, Rolls-Royce, in co-operation with other European manufacturers, has been a major contractor for the RB199 which in several variants powers the Panavia Tornado, and also for the EJ200 engine for the Eurofighter Typhoon. Rolls-Royce has matured the Rolls-Royce LiftSystem invented by Lockheed Martin for the F-35 Lightning II to production level; The F-35 is planned to be produced in significant numbers.

Air China

At the 2005 Paris Air Show, Rolls-Royce secured in excess of $1 billion worth of orders. The firm received $800m worth of orders from Air China to supply its 20 Airbus A330 jets.

Qatar Airways

On 18 June 2007, Rolls-Royce announced at the 2007 Paris Air Show that it had signed a large contract with Qatar Airways for the Trent XWB to power 80 A350s on order from Airbus worth $5.6 billion at list prices.

Emirates airlines

On 11 November 2007, Rolls-Royce announced at the Dubai Airshow that it had signed its largest ever contract with Emirates for Trent XWBs to power 50 A350-900 and 20 A350-1000 aircraft with 50 option rights. Due to be delivered from 2014, the order is potentially worth up to 8.4 billion US Dollars at list prices.

On 20 November 2007, Rolls-Royce announced plans to build its first Asian aero engine facility in the Seletar Aerospace Park, Singapore. The $562m (£355m) plant complements its existing facility at Derby by concentrating on the assembly and testing of large civil engines, including Trent 1000 and Trent XWB. Productivity will be higher than at Derby, as the plant is fully integrated, as opposed to manufacturing occurring across five sites in the UK: a Trent 900 will take only 14 days to manufacture, as opposed to 20 in the UK. Originally expected to provide employment for 330 people, by the start of production in 2012, 1,600 employees were based in Singapore.

Nuclear submarines

In May 2012, Rolls-Royce Marine Power Operations won a Ministry of Defence contract worth more than £400 million for the integration of the reactor design, the PWR3, for UK's next generation nuclear-armed submarines. In March 2023, Rolls-Royce announced that Rolls-Royce Submarines Limited will provide nuclear reactors for the SSN-AUKUS class of submarines for both the Royal Navy and Royal Australian Navy. To support the SSN-AUKUS programme, Rolls-Royce announced it would double the size of the Rolls-Royce Submarines LTD site in Raynesway, Derby creating 1,170 jobs in the process

== Corruption allegations ==
Rolls-Royce has been accused numerous times of corrupt practices and bribery.

In 2014, facing allegations of bribery in the aftermath of the Sudhir Choudhrie affair, Rolls-Royce offered to return money to the Indian government. The Serious Fraud Office (SFO) also investigated allegations of bribery in Indonesia and China.

In February 2015 Rolls-Royce was accused of bribing an employee of Brazil's state-controlled oil company to win a $100 million contract to provide gas turbines for oil platforms.

In October 2016 a joint Guardian and BBC investigation alleged widespread corruption by Rolls-Royce through middlemen in foreign countries including Brazil, India, China, Indonesia, South Africa, Angola, Iraq, Iran, Kazakhstan, Azerbaijan, Nigeria and Saudi Arabia. Rolls-Royce became subject to a major SFO investigation.

=== Alleged defects ===
In 2013 media reported allegations from two American ex-employees that thousands of the company's new jet engines were assembled with used parts.

=== Settlement with SFO ===
In January 2017 Rolls-Royce came to an agreement with the SFO to pay £671 million under a deferred prosecution agreement to avoid prosecution for bribery to obtain export contracts. As part of this agreement, a $170 million fine was paid to US authorities to end a bribery investigation, and $25 million to the Brazilian authorities.

Subsequent to the settlement, Private Eye reported that some of Rolls-Royce's contracts under the scope of the SFO investigation had been supported by the British government's UK Export Finance department, using taxpayers' money. The government department underwrote multimillion-pound liabilities under Rolls-Royce contracts secured with the help of bribes and "facilitation" commissions. It has also been highlighted in the press that Rolls-Royce's auditor since 1995, KPMG, had failed to identify any corrupt practices throughout the 1990s and 2000s. This is notable considering judge Brian Leveson's statement that Rolls-Royce's offending was "multi-jurisdictional, numerous", "persistent and spanned from 1989 until 2013", and it "involved substantial funds being made available to fund bribe payments".

== Governance ==
As of August 2021 the board of directors consists of:

- Sir Ian Davis, Chairman
- Warren East, Chief Executive
- Panos Kakoullis, Chief Financial Officer
- Paul Adams, Independent Non-Executive Director
- George Culmer, Independent Non-Executive Director
- Irene Dorner, Independent Non-Executive Director
- Anita Frew, Independent Non-Executive Director and Chair Designate
- Beverly Goulet, Independent Non-Executive Director
- Lee Hsien Yang, Independent Non-Executive Director
- Nick Luff, Independent Non-Executive Director
- Sir Kevin Smith, Senior Independent Director
- Dame Angela Strank, Independent Non-Executive Director
- Pamela Coles, Company Secretary and Chief Governance Officer

== Finances ==
	2016	2017	2018	2019	2020	2021	2022	2023	2024	2025
Total revenue (£ bn)	15.0	16.3	15.7	16.6	11.8	11.2	13.5	16.5	18.9	21.2
Operating income (£ bn)	0.4	1.3	-0.8	-0.9	-0.5	0.5	0.8	1.8	2.4	4.2
Net income (£ bn)	-4.0	4.2	-2.4	-1.3	-3.2	0.1	-1.3	2.4	2.5	5.8
Total assets (£ bn)	25.5	30.0	31.9	32.3	29.5	28.7	29.5	31.5	35.7	38.1
Total equity (£ bn)	1.9	6.2	-1.1	-3.4	-4.9	-4.6	-6.0	-3.6	-0.9	2.8
Full Time Employees	49,900	50,000	54,500	51,700	48,200	44,000	41,800	41,400	42,210	43,160

== Products ==
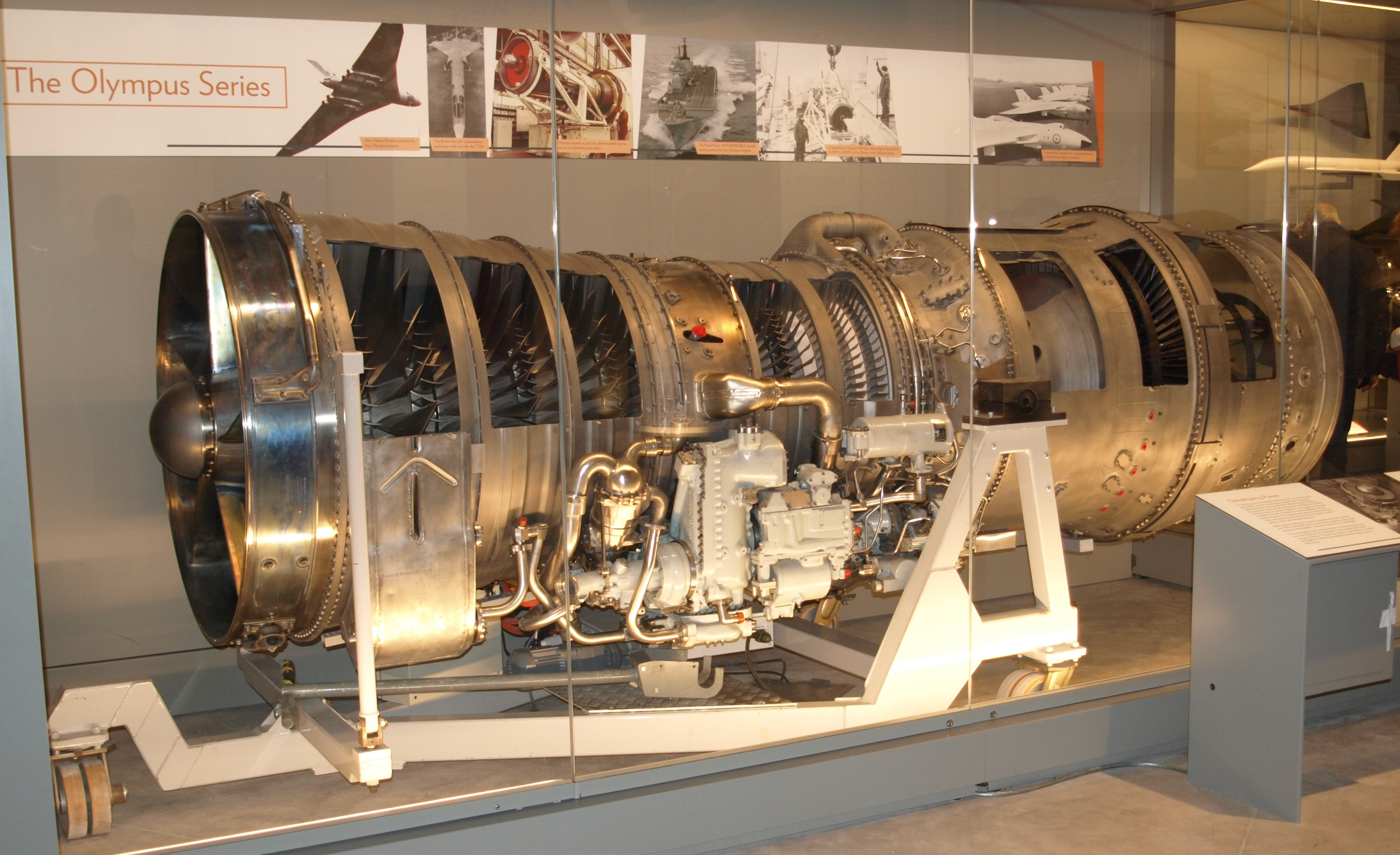
The Olympus 593 powered the Concorde supersonic transport.

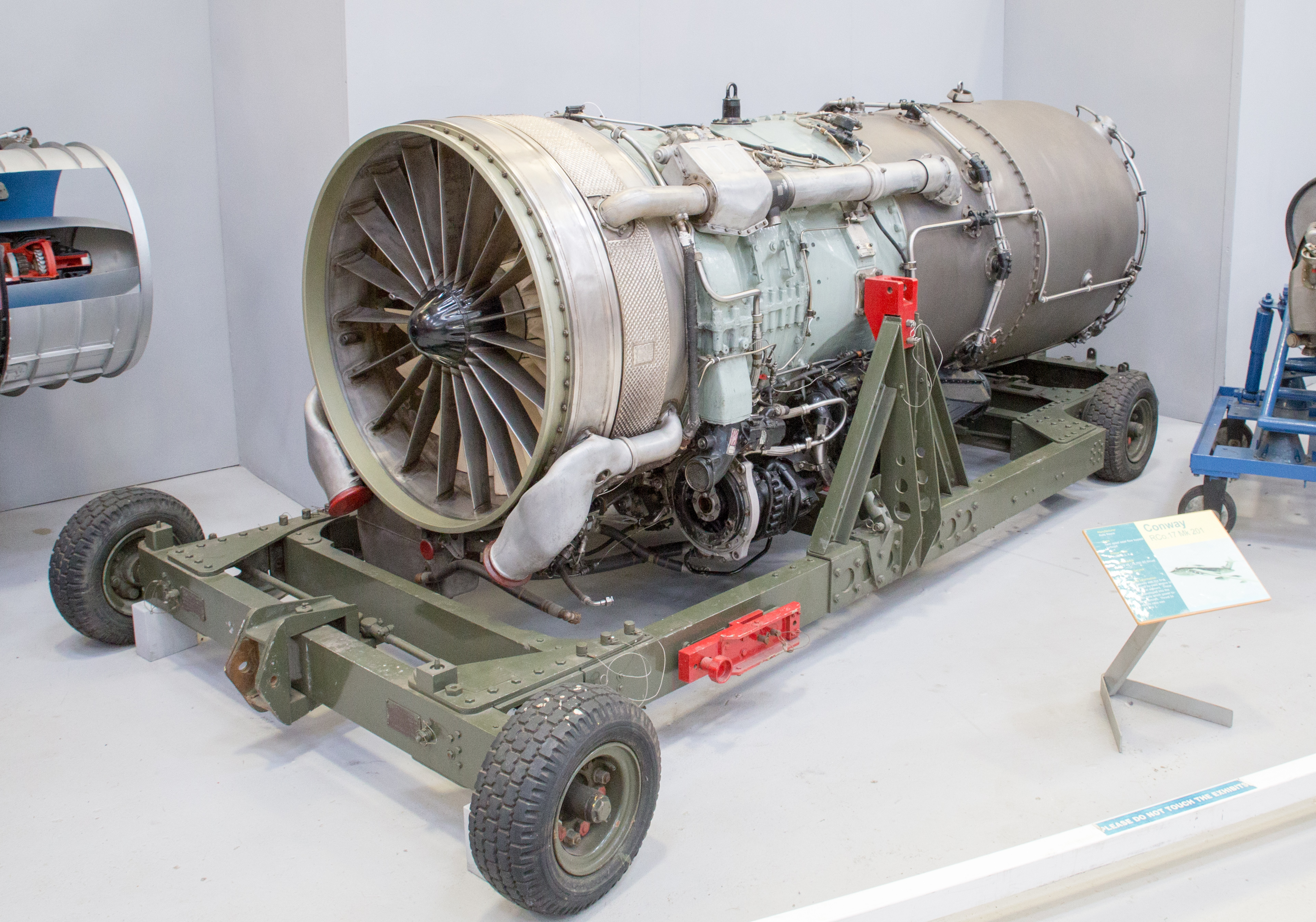
The Conway was the first turbofan to enter service.

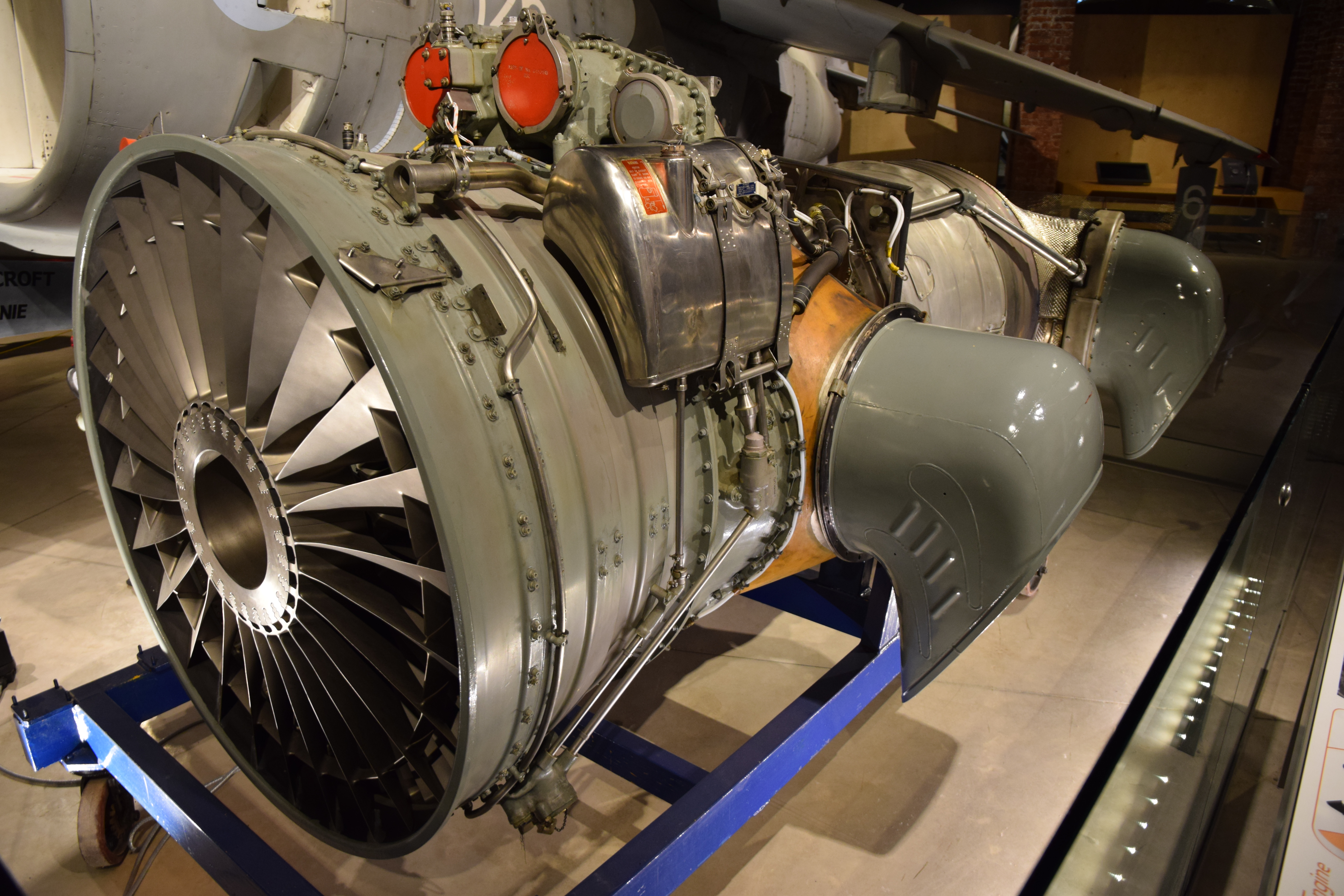
The Pegasus with vectored thrust for the Harrier jump jet

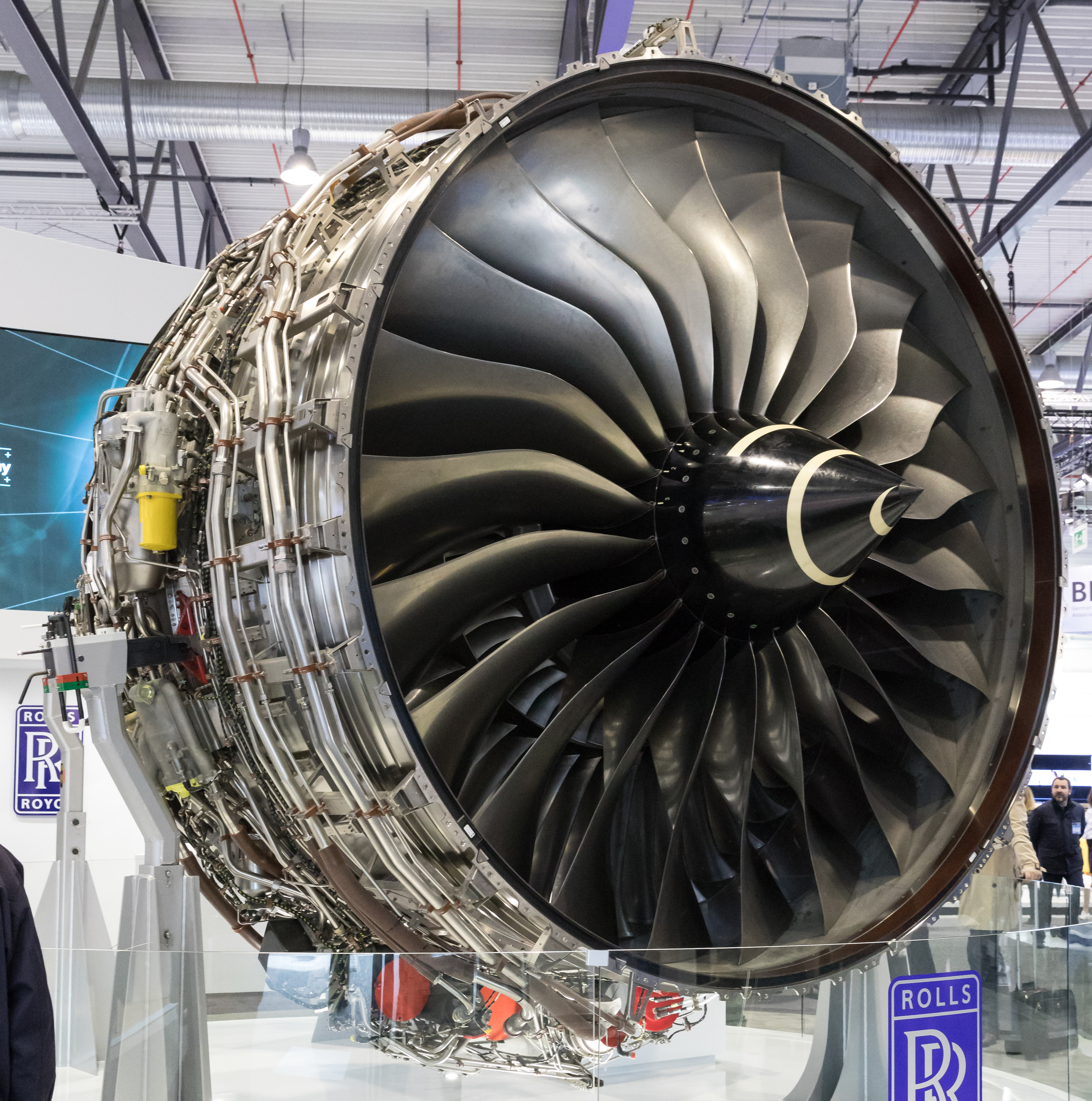
The A350's Trent XWB is Rolls-Royce largest engine.

Rolls-Royce's aerospace business makes commercial and military gas turbine engines for military, civil, and corporate aircraft customers worldwide. In the United States, the company makes engines for regional and corporate jets, helicopters, and turboprop aircraft. Rolls-Royce also constructs and installs power generation systems. Its core gas turbine technology has created one of the broadest product ranges of aero-engines in the world, with 50,000 engines in service with 500 airlines, 2,400 corporate and utility operators and more than 100 armed forces, powering both fixed- and rotary-wing aircraft. Rolls-Royce Marine Power Operations (a subsidiary company) manufactures and tests nuclear reactors for Royal Naval submarines.

=== Aerospace ===
In 2019, Rolls-Royce delivered 510 Trent powerplants, while 5,029 large engines were installed, including 32% Trent 700s. For business jets, research and development in the market niches is a $2 billion annual investment, for a predicted market of 8,500 to 9,000 aircraft over the 2020 decade.

==== Turbojets ====
- Rolls-Royce Avon
- Rolls-Royce Viper
- Rolls-Royce/Snecma Olympus 593
- Rolls-Royce RB162

==== Turbofans ====
- Eurojet EJ200
- General Electric/Rolls-Royce F136 (not developed)
- International Aero Engines V2500
- Rolls-Royce AE 3007
- Rolls-Royce BR700
  - BR710
  - BR715
  - BR725
  - F130
  - Pearl 15
  - Pearl 700
  - Pearl 10X
- Rolls-Royce Conway
- Rolls-Royce RB211
- Rolls-Royce RB282 (not developed)
- Rolls-Royce Spey
- Rolls-Royce Tay
- Rolls-Royce Pegasus
- Rolls-Royce Trent
  - First Trent 600
  - Trent 700
  - Trent 800
  - Trent 8100
  - Trent 500
  - Trent 900
  - Second Trent 600
  - Trent 1000
  - Trent 1500
  - Trent XWB
  - Trent 7000
  - UltraFan
- Rolls-Royce/Turbomeca Adour
- Turbo-Union RB199

==== Turboshafts ====
- LHTEC T800 (with Honeywell)
- MTR390 (with MTU and Turbomeca)
- Rolls-Royce Gem
- Rolls-Royce Model 250
- Rolls-Royce RR300
- Rolls-Royce RR500
- Rolls-Royce T406/AE 1107C-Liberty
- Rolls-Royce/Turbomeca RTM322

==== Turboprops ====
- Europrop TP400-D6 (as part of Europrop International)
- Rolls-Royce AE 2100
- Rolls-Royce T56

==== Rocket engines ====
- Larch
- RB545 (HOTOL)
- RZ.2

=== Marine ===
==== Gas turbines ====
- AG9140
- MT7
- MT30
- Rolls Royce RR4500
- Spey SM1A and improved SM1C
- Olympus TM1, TM1A and improved TM3B
- Tyne RM1A and improved RM1C
- WR-21

==== Propulsion ====
- Kamewa and Bird-Johnson Waterjets
- Kamewa Tunnel thruster
- MerMaid pod propulsion
- Ulstein Aquamaster Azimuth thruster
- Rolls-Royce MTU Engines

==== Submarine ====
- Nato Submarine Rescue System
- PWR1 reactor
- PWR2 reactor
- PWR3 reactor
- Zebra (battery)

==== Stabilisers ====
- Brown Brothers Legacy Stabilizers
- Brown Brothers Neptune or VM Stabilizers
- Brown Brothers Aquarius Stabilizers

== See also ==
- Aerospace industry in the United Kingdom
- GE Aerospace, competing engine manufacturer
- Pratt & Whitney, competing engine manufacturer
- Power by the Hour
- Survivable Airborne Operations Center
