= Allison Model 250 =

Turboshaft aircraft engine

Model 250 / T63
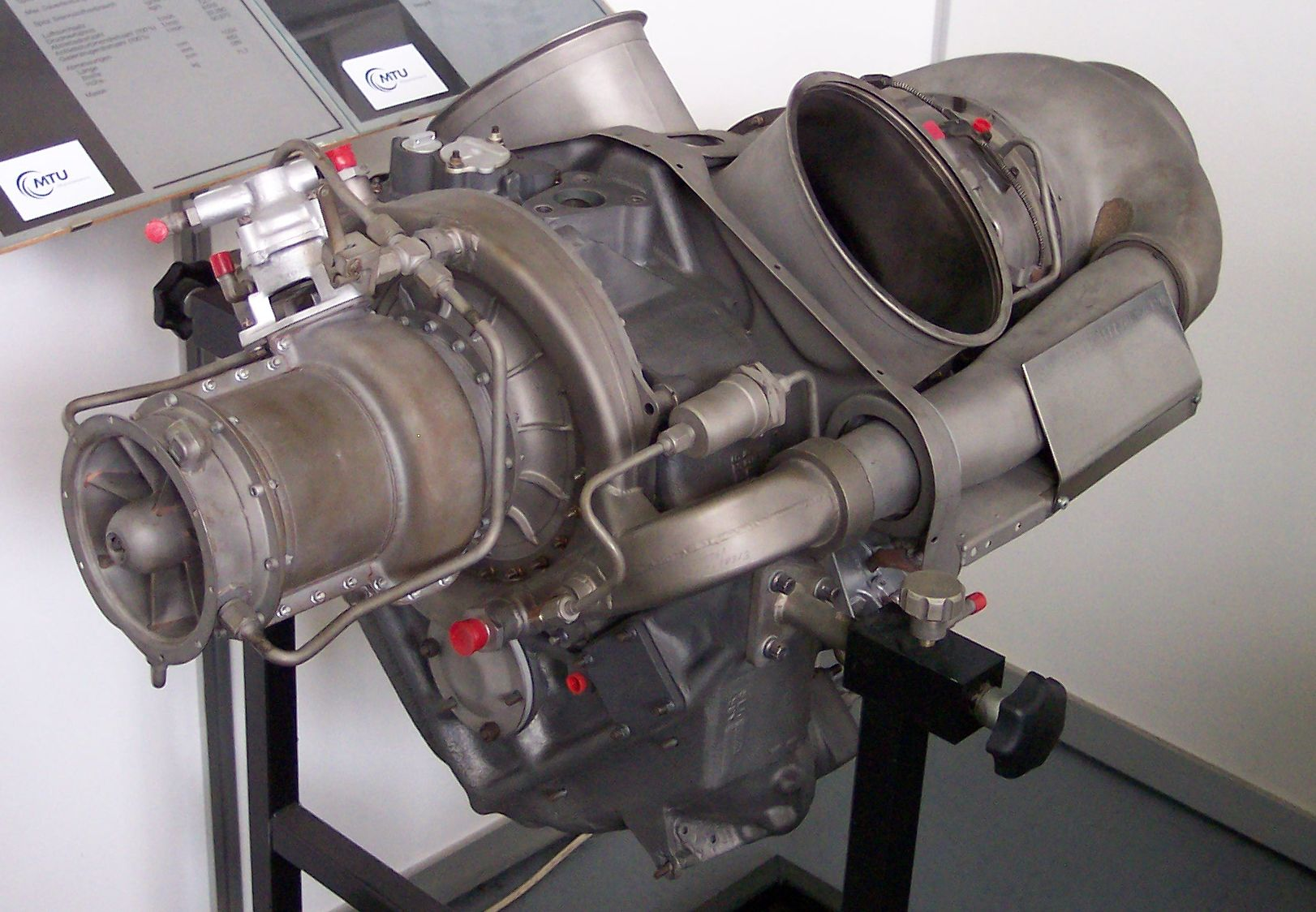
- MTU-built Allison 250-C20B
- Type: Turboshaft/Turboprop
- National origin: United States
- Manufacturer: Allison Engine Company; Rolls-Royce plc
- Major applications: Bell 206; Britten-Norman BN-2T Turbine Islander; MD Helicopters MD 500; MBB Bo 105; Sikorsky S-76; Agusta A109 A, B, C
- Number built: >30,000
- Developed into: Rolls-Royce RR500
- Variants: Rolls-Royce RR300

The Allison Model 250 – now known as the Rolls-Royce M250 and designated the T63/T703 in US military service – is a successful turboshaft engine family, originally developed by the Allison Engine Company in the early 1960s. Rolls-Royce has produced the Model 250 since it acquired Allison in 1995.

== Development ==
In 1958, the Detroit Diesel Allison division of General Motors was chosen by the US Army to develop a new light turbine engine to power a "Light Observation Aircraft" (LOA); the goal was to replace the Cessna O-1A Bird Dog aircraft. At this stage, the US Army was unsure whether to use a fixed- or rotary-wing aircraft, so Allison was instructed to consider both applications. The design studies considered a range of possible mechanical configurations for the turboprop/turboshaft. These studies culminated in testing the prototype engine, designated YT63-A-3, in April 1959. In 1960, the US Army settled on a rotary-wing platform. The YT63-A-3 first flew in a variant of the Bell 47 helicopter in 1961. A modified version of the engine (the YT63-A-5) – with the exhaust pointing upward (to avoid grass fires) – soon followed. This version, rated at 250 hp, passed the Model Qualification Test in September 1962. The Hughes OH-6 design, powered by the T63, was selected for the US Army Light Observation Helicopter (LOH) in May 1965.

The Model 250 powers many helicopters, small aircraft, and a motorcycle (the MTT Turbine Superbike). As a result, nearly 30,000 Model 250 engines have been produced, of which approximately 16,000 remain in service; thus, the Model 250 is one of the best-selling engines made by Rolls-Royce.

== Design ==
Allison adopted a reverse-airflow engine configuration for the Model 250: although air enters the intake/compression system conventionally, the compressed air leaving the centrifugal compressor diffuser is ported rearwards via two transfer pipes – which go around the outside of the turbine system – before the air is turned 180 degrees upon entry to the combustor. The combustion products expand axially forward through the two-stage (single-stage on early engines) high-pressure turbine section, which is connected to the compressor via the HP shaft. The combustion products continue to expand through the two-stage power turbine, which generates shaft horsepower for the aircraft. A coaxial stub shaft connects the power turbine to a compact reduction gearbox, located inboard, between the centrifugal compressor and the exhaust/power turbine system. The exhaust stream then turns 90 degrees to exit the engine radially through twin exhaust ducts, which form a V-shape visible in front elevation.

An important design feature of the Model 250 engine is its modular construction, which significantly simplifies maintenance and repair activities. The unique reverse-flow design also facilitates hot-section maintenance. The engine has four modules:

- a compressor module at the front of the engine,
- a gearbox module (including accessory drives),
- a turbine module (including V-shaped exhaust ports),
- and a combustion module (including twin compressed air transfer ducts) at the rear.

Earlier versions of the engine have seven axial compressor stages mounted on the HP shaft to supercharge a relatively low-pressure-ratio centrifugal compressor. The C20B version is typical, with an overall pressure ratio of 7.2:1, an airflow of 3.45 lb/s (1.56 kg/s), and a shaft power output of 420 hp (310 kW).

One of the latest versions of the Model 250 is the C40, which has only a centrifugal compressor, which produces a pressure ratio of 9.2:1, an airflow of 6.1 lb/s (2.8 kg/s), and develops 715 hp (533 kW) at the shaft.

== Variants ==
250-B15
250-B15A
250-B15C
250-B15G
250-B17
250-B17B
250-B17C
250-B17D
250-B17Fg
250-B17F/1
250-B17F/2
250-C10D
250-C18
317 hp (236 kW)
250-C18A
317 hp (236 kW)
250-C20
250-C20B
250-C20F
250-C20J
420 hp (310 kW)
250-C20R
250-C20R/1
250-C20R/2
250-C20R/4
250-C20S
250-C20W
250-C22B
250-C28
250-C28B
250-C28C
250-C30
Built for use with the Sikorsky S-76. Featured a single-stage centrifugal compressor instead of the multi-stage axial/centrifugal compressor of earlier models.
250-C30G
250-C30G/2
250-C30M
250-C30P
250-C30R
250-C30R/3
250-C30R/3M
250-C30S
250-C30U
250-C34
250-C40B
250-C47B
250-C47E
250-C47M
250-E3
Experimental engine containing a regenerative heat exchanger. First regenerative engine to fully power a Vertical Take-Off and Landing (VTOL) aircraft in flight. Ran on a Hughes YOH-6A Light Observation Helicopter in 1967. It is a 185 lb (84 kg) engine that delivers 280 hp (210 kW).
250-KS4
Used aboard marine ships as a starter system for larger gas turbines. Also known as, the Redundant Independent Mechanical Start System (RIMSS).
T63-A-5
T63-A-5A
T63-A-700
317 hp (236 kW)
T63-A-720
420 hp (310 kW)
T703-AD-700
Soloy Turbine-Pac
Typically, two 250-C20S engines driving a single propeller via a combining gearbox, each being able to operate individually.
Mitsubishi CT63
Licensed production for Kawasaki-Hughes 500/OH-6A helicopters.

== Applications ==
=== Fixed-wing ===
- Aermacchi M-290 RediGO
- BAE Systems Mantis
- Beechcraft Bonanza (prop-jet conversions)
- Britten-Norman BN-2T Turbine Islander
- Cessna P210 Silver Eagle (conversion)
- Extra EA-500
- Fuji T-5
- Fuji T-7
- GAF Nomad
- Gippsland GA10
- Grob G 120TP
- Partenavia AP.68TP variants - Spartacus & Viator
- RFB Fantrainer
- SIAI-Marchetti SF.260TP
- SIAI-Marchetti SM.1019
- Soloy Cessna 206 turbine conversion
- Stoddard-Hamilton T-9 Stalker
- Valmet L-90 Redigo

=== Rotary-wing ===
- Agusta A109A
- Bell 206
- Bell 407
- Bell 222SP
- Bell 230
- Bell 430
- Bell OH-58 Kiowa
- Bell YOH-4
- Boeing AH-6
- Cicaré CH-14
- Enstrom 480
- Eurocopter AS355F
- Fairchild Hiller FH-1100
- HESA Shahed 285
- Hughes OH-6 Cayuse
- Kamov Ka-226
- MBB Bo 105
- MBB Bo 108
- MD Helicopters MD 500
- MD Helicopters MD 600
- MD Helicopters MH-6 Little Bird
- Northrop Grumman MQ-8 Fire Scout
- PZL Kania
- PZL SW-4
- Schweizer 330/330SP
- Schweizer S-333
- Sikorsky S-76

=== Other applications ===
- Gerhardt 66 – USAC IndyCar racing car
- Loral GZ-22 – non-rigid airship
- MTT Turbine Superbike – motorcycle
- Redundant Independent Mechanical Start System (RIMSS) – used on gas turbine ships

== Engines on display ==
A partially sectioned Allison 250-C20B is on public display at the City of Norwich Aviation Museum in Horsham St Faith, Norfolk, England.

== Specifications Model 250-C18 (T63-A-700) ==
Data from The Instrumentation Design And Control of a T63-A-700 Gas Turbine Engine

==== General characteristics ====
- Type: turboshaft
- Length: 40.5 in (1,029 mm)
- Diameter: 22.5 in (572 mm)
- Dry weight: 138.5 lb (63 kg) dry

==== Components ====
- Compressor: 6-stage axial + 1-stage centrifugal
- Combustors: single-can combustion chamber
- Turbine: 2-stage axial gas generator power turbine + 2-stage axial free-power output turbine
- Fuel type: JP-4 aviation kerosene (alternatively JP-1 or JP-5)
- Oil system: pressure spray/splash, dry sump

==== Performance ====
- Maximum power output: 317 hp (236 kW) for take-off (Sea Level 59 °F (15 °C); 51,600 rpm N_{H}, 35,000 rpm N_{L}, 6,000 rpm N_{out})
- Overall pressure ratio: 6.2:1
- Air mass flow: 3.3 lb/s (1.5 kg/s)
- Turbine inlet temperature: 1,380 °F (750 °C) at power turbine inlet
- Specific fuel consumption: 0.697 lb/hp·h (0.424 kg/kW·h)
- Power-to-weight ratio: 2.289 hp/lb (3.765 kW/kg)

== See also ==
Related development

- Rolls-Royce RR300
- Rolls-Royce RR500
