= Aero Engine Controls =

Predecessor of Rolls-Royce Controls and Data Services

- Company type: Limited
- Industry: Aerospace
- Headquarters: Birmingham, Derby UK
- Website: www.aeroenginecontrols.com

Aero Engine Controls is the former name of Rolls-Royce Controls and Data Services. The company produces engine control software, electronic engine controls (EEC), fuel metering units (FMU), fuel pumps and engine actuators for a large number of common commercial and military aircraft. Together these parts comprise the control system for a jet engine, responsible for delivering the correct amount of fuel and maintaining engine safety.

== History ==
The company was originally part of Lucas Industries, responsible for producing fuel systems for aircraft. From 1938 the company produced fueling systems for World War II aircraft. In August 1996 the company was merged, along with the rest of Lucas Industries, with the North American Varity Corporation to form LucasVarity. In 1999 LucasVarity was acquired by TRW for $6.6bn, which sold the Lucas Aerospace section of the company to Goodrich Corporation for $1.5bn in 2002.

In 2008 Rolls-Royce was the second largest producer of aircraft engines worldwide behind General Electric and ahead of Pratt & Whitney. As the focus for engine efficiency shifts towards sophisticated engine control techniques, Rolls-Royce found it could potentially fall behind its competitors as the only one of the three companies to outsource these key components. Rolls-Royce and the Goodrich Corporation saw an opportunity for partnership, combining the existing manufacturing capability of Goodrich with the expertise of Rolls-Royce.

The Rolls-Royce Goodrich engine controls joint venture was announced on 14 August 2008 and agreement between the two companies was made on 22 December 2008 to form 'Rolls-Royce Goodrich Engine Control Systems Limited' with the trading company name of Aero Engine Controls. In the formation of Aero Engine Controls both companies contributed over £14m in assets and cash to the joint venture, with Rolls-Royce making a cash payment to the Goodrich Corporation of $100m.

Following the acquisition of Goodrich by United Technologies Corporation in July 2012, Rolls-Royce announced it would purchase Goodrich's 50% share of Aero Engine Controls. The purchase was completed on 10 December 2012 and Aero Engine Controls is now wholly owned by Rolls-Royce Plc. and is part of the Rolls-Royce Group.

In 2014 Aero Engine Controls was merged with Optimized Systems and Solutions (OSyS) to form Rolls-Royce Control and Data Services.

== Locations ==
- Birmingham, UK
  Aero Engine Controls has one combined manufacturing and engineering site in Birmingham, and employs ~1100 employees.
- Derby, UK
  This is a systems and software engineering site and employs ~300 engineers.
- Belfast, UK
  This is a software engineering centre.
- Indianapolis, USA
  Although the Indianapolis branch is part of Aero Engine Controls the company, it is a separate legal entity with its own board of directors. This allows Aero Engine Controls to participate in large classified US defence contracts, which it would otherwise be unable to do for reasons of national security.
  The Indianapolis branch is expanding rapidly and is able to work alongside the existing Rolls-Royce manufacturing plant in the city. Due to rapid growth and demand for engineering expertise, between 2011 and 2013 Aero Engine Controls plans to add up to 159 engineering jobs to the current 89, and plans to "add an assembly and test organisation in Indianapolis in the next few years".

== Project Involvement ==
Aero Engine Controls provides products to some of the world's most advanced and efficient engines, both for civil and military application.

Notable aircraft for which Aero Engine Controls has provided its key components include but are not exclusive to:

=== Large Civil ===
- Boeing 787 Dreamliner
- Boeing 777
- Boeing 747
- Boeing 767
- Airbus A380
- Airbus A330
- Airbus A350

=== Regionals ===
- Embraer ERJ 145

=== Corporates (Businessjets) ===
- Gulfstream G650
- Gulfstream G350 and G550
- Bombardier Global Express

=== Helicopters ===
- Sea-King
- NH90
- EH101 Merlin

=== Defence ===
Aero Engine Controls provides main and afterburner systems and centrifugal pumping systems for most modern military jet engines including:

- Eurofighter Typhoon
- V22-Osprey
- Boeing T-45 Goshawk
- BAE Systems Hawk
- Northrop Grumman Global Hawk
- Lockheed Martin C-130J
