= Eagle Helicycle =

American single-seat helicopter

Helicycle
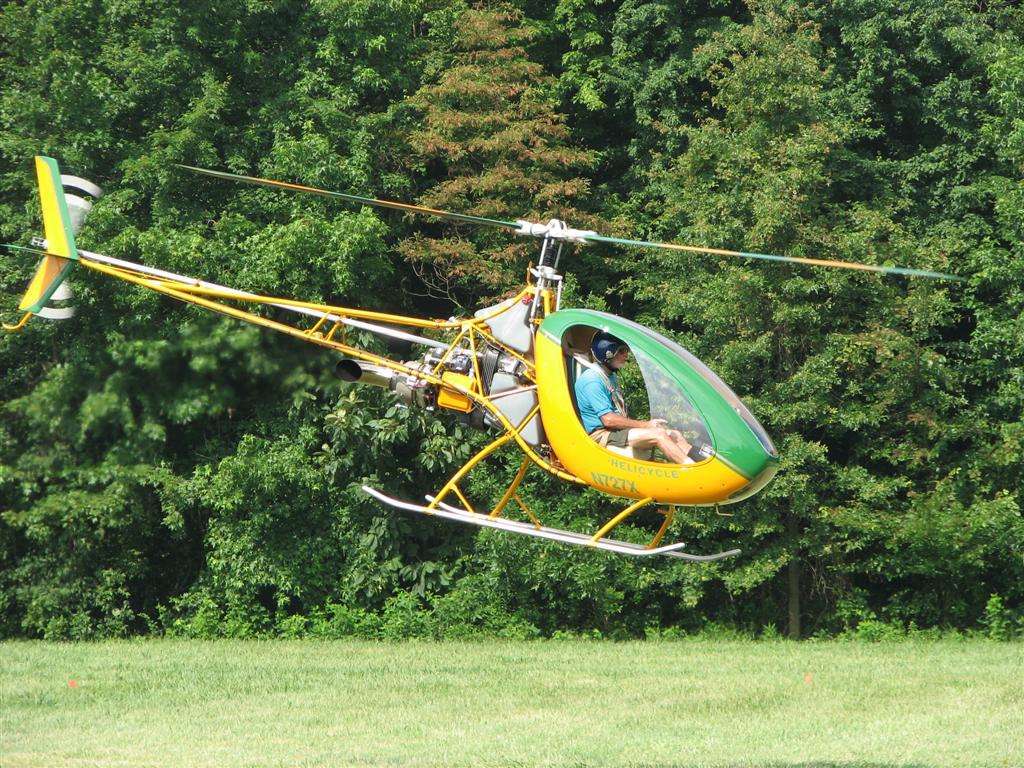
- Helicycle N727X at Homer Bell's 22nd Annual Helicopter Fly-in, July 14, 2006

General information
- Type: Homebuilt helicopter
- Manufacturer: Eagle R&D
- Designer: B.J. Schramm
- Number built: 85+

History
- First flight: September, 1997

The Helicycle is a single-seat, semi-rigid two-bladed main rotor, helicopter powered by a Solar T62-32 engine. Manufactured by Helicycle Ventures LLC in Mesilla, New Mexico as a kit, the aircraft is intended to be assembled by the owner and is considered a homebuilt aircraft. The Helicycle was conceived and designed by B.J. Schramm, the founder of RotorWay International.

== Development ==
Schramm's concept for the Helicycle was to provide a kit for building a reliable, high-performance, real helicopter for a reasonable cost to individuals (on the order of a mid-priced SUV). Fabrication and assembly skills only require being able to accurately drill holes, bend sheet metal and tubing, install fasteners, run wiring, etc.; no welding or highly specialized aviation-specific tools are required. Kits are delivered in six increments, including the frame and skids, engine, transmission, main rotor subassembly, tail rotor subassembly, controls and linkages, cockpit exterior/interior, and fuel and electrical subsystems. Assembly instructions are provided in the form of video clips on video CDs (Video CDs) or DVDs, blueprints, and checklists.

== Design ==
Specific design features include a fully harmonized rotor, a modulated collective pitch system, very low twice-per-revolution vibration level due to elastomeric thrust bearings, a sufficient flapping angle for low-"G" maneuvers and slope landings, control friction devices, and an electronic throttle control (governor).

The feel of the controls in the Helicycle is modeled after that of the Robinson R22, such that quick stops and autorotations are performed similarly in both aircraft, reportedly allowing new pilots to transition to flying their kits with minimal adjustments.

== Operational history ==
The Helicycle helicopter is the first experimental helicopter kit in mass-production to be powered by a turbine engine, the military surplus Solar T62-T32, capable of producing 150 shaft horsepower. The engine is limited to 95 horsepower due to torque limits on the main gearbox and rotor system.

As of June 2010, five runs of about 30 kits each had been delivered to builders, for a total of 160 kits, of which more than 80 had been completed and were flying, with another kit being completed every other month, on average (delivery of a sixth run was scheduled to start in 2010). A unique feature of the kits is that a factory checkout must be completed by a factory-designated airframe and power plant (A&P) technician and test pilot before the builder is allowed to fly the aircraft. The factory withholds a few critical components needed for flight, such as the main rotor bearings, which the factory representative brings to the checkout. In order to ensure that prospective pilots have the necessary flight skills, builders must have at least a solo endorsement from a certified flight instructor (CFI) for flying a commercially-built Robinson R22 helicopter.

The total number of hours accumulated on all Helicycles flying is estimated to be well in excess of 3,000 flight hours, with three fatal accidents, the latest occurring on 28 September 2014 in rural Sumner county, Tennessee.

The NTSB report on the fatal accident indicates extensive damage to the helicopter due to impact with a body of water. An examination of the anti-torque pedal assembly by the NTSB Materials Laboratory revealed that the fracture surface patterns found on it were consistent with a bending overstress separation. It could not be determined whether the overstress condition was the result of a precrash or postcrash event. According to the probable cause report, N3275Q suffered "inflight collision with terrain/water", and "reason for occurrence undetermined - Pilot In Command".

There have been several accidents and incidents where Helicycles have lost power in/near hover, resulting in minor damage to the skids and some airframes, but no serious injuries. Most of these were attributed to a radio-frequency interference (RFI) problem with the electronic governor, and the issue was reportedly solved with better shielding in 2005. At least one accident may have been caused by a crack in a fuel line due to lack of mechanical support between a manifold and a fuel injection port. Another accident involved flight into high-voltage power distribution wires, but the aircraft was able to fly again, following repairs, and the pilot was not seriously injured.

== Specifications (Helicycle) ==
Data from Eagle R&D

General characteristics

- Crew: one
- Capacity: 351 lb (159 kg)
- Length: 20 ft 10 in (6.35 m)
- Wingspan: 19 ft 10 in (6.05 m)
- Height: 7 ft 4 in (2.23 m)
- Wing area: 308 sq ft (28.6 m^{2})
- Empty weight: 500 lb (227 kg)
- Max takeoff weight: 850 lb (386 kg)
- Powerplant: 1 × Solar T62-T32 turboshaft, 150 shp (112 kW)

Performance

- Maximum speed: 96 kn (110 mph, 177 km/h)
- Cruise speed: 83 kn (95 mph, 153 km/h)
- Range: 140 nmi (160 mi, 257 km)
- Service ceiling: 21,000 ft (3,353 m)
- Rate of climb: 900 ft/min (4.6 m/s)

== See also ==
- Special Airworthiness Certificate
- RotorWay International

Related lists

- List of single seat helicopters
