= RotorWay 300T Eagle =

American homebuilt helicopter

300T Eagle
- Artist's concept of the RotorWay 300T Eagle

General information
- Type: Helicopter
- National origin: United States
- Manufacturer: RotorWay International
- Status: probably cancelled

The RotorWay 300T Eagle is an American helicopter that was under development by RotorWay International of Chandler, Arizona, in 2009-2011. The aircraft was intended to be certified and supplied as a complete ready-to-fly-aircraft for the flight training and aerial work markets.

The aircraft was announced at AirVenture 2009, with a first flight then predicted for 2010. The company started taking US$5,000 customer deposits at that time.

== Design and development ==
The 300T Eagle features a single main rotor, a two-seats-in side-by-side configuration enclosed cockpit with a windshield, skid-type landing gear and a 300 hp (224 kW) Rolls-Royce RR300-B1 turboshaft engine. The aircraft has an empty weight of 950 lb (431 kg) and a gross weight of 2,050 lb (930 kg), giving a useful load of 1,100 lb (499 kg). With full fuel of 80 U.S. gallons (300 L; 67 imp gal) the payload is 580 lb (263 kg).

Since the initial announcement of the aircraft in 2009 no further information has been provided by the company and no announcement of a first flight has been made. The company's webpage about the aircraft had been removed by the end of 2011 and the project may have been cancelled.

== Specifications (300T Eagle) ==
Data from Bayerl and RotorWay

General characteristics

- Crew: one
- Capacity: one passenger
- Empty weight: 950 lb (431 kg)
- Gross weight: 2,050 lb (930 kg)
- Fuel capacity: 80 U.S. gallons (300 L; 67 imp gal)
- Powerplant: 1 × Rolls-Royce RR300-B1 turboshaft aircraft engine, 300 hp (220 kW)

Performance

- Cruise speed: 127 mph (204 km/h, 110 kn)
- Endurance: 2:30
- Service ceiling: 13,000 ft (4,000 m)
- Rate of climb: 1,600 ft/min (8 m/s)
