= Scott's – Bell 47 =

American aviation parts supplier

- Industry: Aerospace
- Founded: 2009
- Headquarters: Le Sueur, Minnesota, United States
- Key people: Scott Churchill, President; Frank Hoffmann, General Manager
- Products: Helicopters
- Website: http://www.scottsbell47.com

Scott's – Bell 47, Inc. is an American company that supports the Bell 47 helicopter. The company was formed in 2009 after acquiring the type certificates from Bell Helicopter. The company supplies original specification parts either new, overhauled or remade as well as new Supplemental type certificate parts including composite rotor blades for the Bell 47.

== New model ==
SB47 announced at Heli Expo 2013 its intention to develop a new Model 47, named the 47GT-6. The 47GT-6 would be built to the 47G-3B-2A type design and would feature a number of modernizations, including the Rolls-Royce RR300 gas turbine engine, a new instrument panel, LED exterior lights, new interior, and composite main rotor blades. SB47 also hopes to lower the operating cost with the use of modern drive train technologies. A 30-month program was expected, with flight testing beginning within one year. Deliveries were expected to begin in 2016. Some progress seemed to have been made, in 2014 Rolls-Royce confirmed orders for the RR300 series engine, and reported there were 38 pre-orders for the helicopter. However, as of October 2020 there was no sign of a new variant of the Bell 47 and the company official website makes no mention of the project and various news sites have no coverage beyond 2015. The project for a new model now appears to be defunct.
