= Rolls-Royce RR300 =

Turbine aircraft engine

RR300
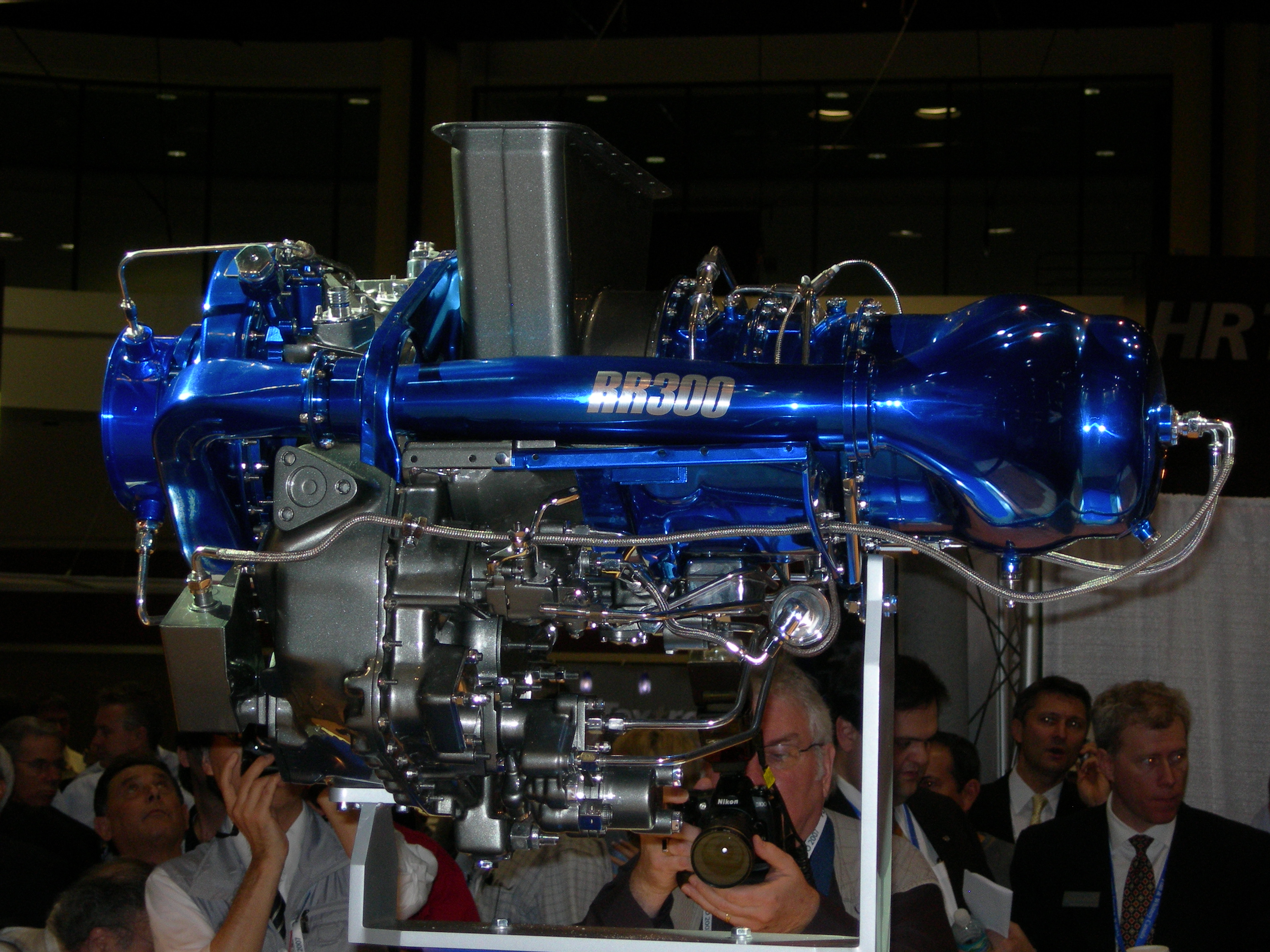
- The RR300 was unveiled at Heli-Expo 2007.
- Type: Turboshaft
- Manufacturer: Rolls-Royce North America
- Major applications: Robinson R66
- Developed from: Rolls-Royce Model 250

The Rolls-Royce RR300 is a turbine aircraft engine (turboshaft/turboprop) developed for the light helicopter/general aviation market. Rated at up to 300 shp (224 kW) at take-off power, the RR300 is a rebadged and downrated variant of the Rolls-Royce Model 250-C20.

== Design and development ==
The Model 250-C18 certified in 1965 was rated at a similar power level to that of the RR300, but over the last forty years subsequent sub-models have become more efficient and produce substantially more power. For instance the Model 250-C40, with an overall pressure ratio of 9.2:1 at an airflow 6.1 lb/s, develops 715 shp.

The RR300 mates a scaled-down centrifugal compressor from the Model 250-C40/47 to a combustor and turbine similar to that of the Model 250-C20, replacing the C20's complex six-stage axial/single-stage centrifugal compressor. The RR300 retains the look and layout of the Model 250 from which it is derived.

The RR300 is the second attempt to develop a lower-rated version of the Model 250, coming 20 years after the 350 shp Allison Model 225 of 1987.

The five-seat Robinson R66 light helicopter features the RR300 as a turboshaft engine, Robinson having originally intended on utilizing the standard Model 250-C20. Rolls-Royce has also announced the signing of Memorandums of Understanding with Enstrom, MD Helicopters, RotorWay and Schweizer to discuss future applications of the RR300. In March 2013, the engine was named as the power plant for the new Scott's Bell 47GT-6. The 47GT-6 will be based upon the 47G-3B-2A type design and produced by Scott's Bell 47, the current holder of the Bell 47 type certificate.

FAA type certification for the RR300 was achieved in February 2008.

== Applications ==
- Robinson R66
- RotorWay 300T Eagle (Planned, apparently canceled)
- Scott's - Bell 47GT-6
- Innova Helicopters C630 (Planned)

== Specifications (RR300) ==
Data from Rolls-Royce

==== General characteristics ====
- Type: Twin-spool turboshaft/turboprop
- Length: 37.6 inches (96 cm)
- Diameter: 21.5 inches (55 cm)
- Dry weight: 201 pounds (91 kg)

==== Components ====
- Compressor: Single-stage centrifugal
- Turbine: 2 stage GP, 2 stage PT

==== Performance ====
- Maximum power output: 240–300 shaft horsepower (180–220 kW)
- Overall pressure ratio: 6.2
- Power-to-weight ratio: 0.67 pounds per horsepower (0.41 kg/kW)

== See also ==
Related development

- Rolls-Royce Model 250
- Rolls-Royce RR500
