= RotorWay =

American kit helicopter manufacturer

RotorWay International
- Company type: Privately owned company
- Industry: Helicopters, Aviation, Engineering, Manufacturing
- Founded: 1961
- Founder: B.J. Schramm
- Defunct: 2021
- Headquarters: Chandler, Arizona, United States
- Products: Aircraft
- Parent: RotorWay Aviation
- Website: http://www.rotorway.com

The RotorWay Helicopter Manufacturing Company, formerly called RotorWay International, was a manufacturer of kit helicopters located in Chandler, Arizona, United States. The company was founded by B.J. Schramm in 1961 as RotorWay Aircraft. RotorWay International was bought February 14, 2007 by a small group of investors comprising the company's upper-level management – Grant Norwitz, CEO, Bill Adams, COO, and Judy Craven, CFO. Of these, only Norwitz was still with the company in mid-2008.

By 2015 the company name was changed from RotorWay International to the RotorWay Helicopter Manufacturing Company by the new owners.

In 2021 the company plant, designs and assets were purchased by a new company, Rotor X Aircraft Manufacturing, and RotorWay ceased business.

In 2023–2024, Aero-News Network reported receiving complaints from customers alleging non-delivery or partial delivery of kits and parts, and reported that multiple lawsuits had been filed involving Rotor X. Rotor X filed for Chapter 11 bankruptcy protection in October 2023; the case was dismissed later that month and the proceeding was closed in November 2023. In January 2024, Aero-News Network reported that Rotor X announced a management transition and stated an intent to resume business operations.

== History ==
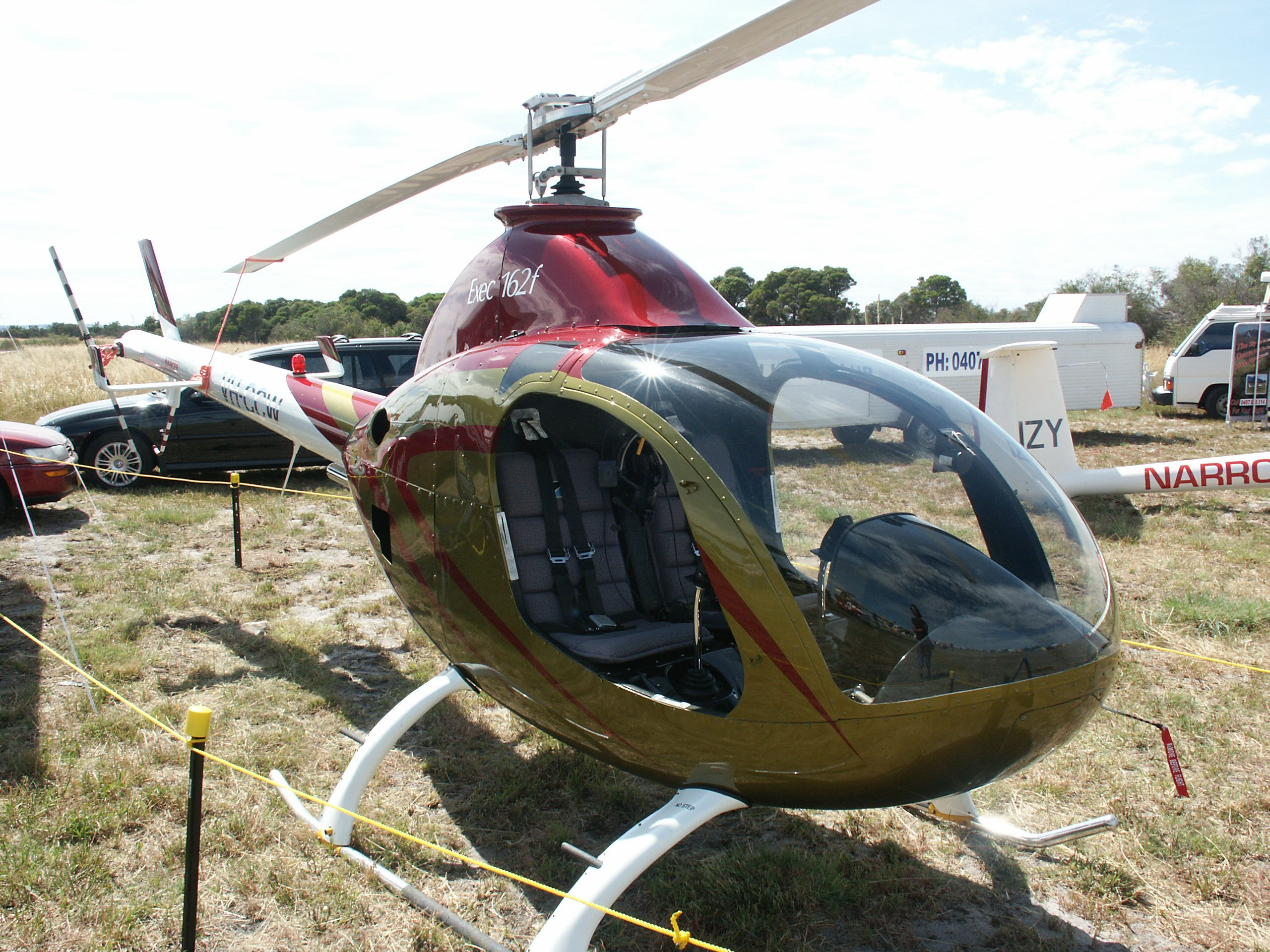
RotorWay Exec 162F.

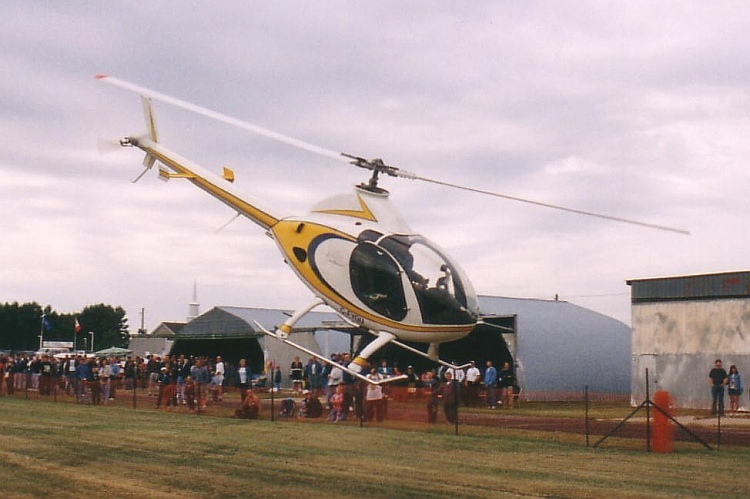
RotorWay Exec 162F transitioning to forward flight.

=== 1960s ===
In 1961, RotorWay's founder, B.J. Schramm, tested the company's first prototype, the Javelin. The Javelin used a 40 hp (30 kW) motorcycle engine, and was the forerunner of RotorWay's first production helicopter, the Scorpion, which was offered in 1967.

The Scorpion, priced at $6,300 (not including the cost of the engine), was the first real kit helicopter on the market that flew. The Scorpion was intended for the sport-flying public, rather than the commercial market and this dictated the cost and weight of the aircraft. Originally, costs were intended to be under $10,000, but inflation changed that. The original Scorpion weighed between 1200 and 1300 pounds. It featured a standard gear reduction drive, a semi-articulated two-bladed rotor system, and a one-person capacity.

=== 1970s ===
An improved version of the Scorpion was introduced in 1971. Among the modifications in the new version were all-aluminum rotor blades, a 115 hp (86 kW) OMC 2-cycle engine (Evinrude Vulcan V-4 outboard motor) and a heavier drive system (shafts and bearings).

In 1971, the Scorpion II was introduced with an OMC 125 hp (93 kW), 2-cycle engine which provided enough power to fly two lightweight people, unlike previous versions.

In 1974, the company eliminated the 2-cycle engine and, unable to find a manufacturer to make their 4-cycle engine suitable for the helicopter, began production of their own engine. This engine, called the RotorWay RW133, was a 4-cycle engine that was able to provide a cruise speed of 80 mph (130 km/h) with a range of 120 miles (193 km) and a useful load of 420 pounds.

The RW 133 engine was installed in the Scorpion II, which was renamed the Scorpion 133. The Scorpion 133 had a list price of $13,500, a gross weight of 1,235 lb (560 kg), and a range of 130 nautical miles (79 nautical miles (146 km) with two people).

=== 1980s ===
In 1980, RotorWay introduced the RW145 engine, and the Exec helicopter. This was the first helicopter produced by RotorWay that strived to get away from the "kit helicopter" look. Unlike previous helicopters, the Exec did not have an exposed frame or exposed engine and far more attention was given to the aesthetics of the aircraft.

1982 marked the introduction of the asymmetrical rotor blade, enabling the craft to climb to higher altitudes and making the blade resistant to erosion, but with a risk of losing the aircraft if the engine quit.

The Exec helicopter was designed during the late 1980s, and had a 152 hp (113 kW) engine with a maximum payload of 400 pounds, cruise speed of 113 mph (182 km/h) and maximum airspeed of 130 mph (210 km/h). After selling just three Exec helicopters, the company succumbed to financial challenges and was purchased by a former customer, John Netherwood, and stopped production of the Exec helicopter due to design hurdles and financial constraints on the company.

The RW152 engine was manufactured in 1984.

=== 1990s ===
Logo of RotorWay International

In 1990 RotorWay Aircraft underwent reorganization and changed its name to RotorWay International.

The design and production of the Exec series helicopters began in the early 1990s, starting with the Exec 90. The Exec 90 contained the RI 162 engine, and, unlike previous helicopter kits, much of the assembly, including the welding, was done at the factory. The Exec 90 was followed by the Exec 162F in 1994.

The Exec 162F, with some improvements to the FADEC system and the ACIS, was produced and sold by RotorWay prior to the company's closure in 2021.

=== 2000s ===
In July 2007, RotorWay announced the development of the A600 Talon. This model features an updated FADEC system, an all-glass cockpit, a cog-belt replacing the primary drive chain, and a larger landing gear, among other features. By 2017 the company just referred to it as the A600, dropping the Talon name in marketing use.

In February 2009, RotorWay purchased PMC Machining and Manufacturing, a Phoenix-based builder of helicopter parts. The CEO of PMC, Mark Porter, became president and COO of RotorWay as part of the acquisition. The company also announced plans to certify a two-seat turbine helicopter using the Rolls-Royce RR300 engine and said that acquiring PMC will make that possible.

=== 2010s ===
In July 2015 the company introduced the RotorWay RW7 model at AirVenture. However, by the end of 2016 the webpage announcing it had been removed and the project seems to have not entered production.

=== 2020s ===
In 2021 the company's factory location, designs and assets were purchased by Rotor X Aircraft Manufacturing, and RotorWay ceased business. AOPA reported that Rotor X stated it would continue producing kits and offering parts for existing RotorWay models.

In 2023, Aero-News Network reported receiving complaints from customers alleging non-delivery or partial delivery of kits and parts, and reported multiple legal disputes involving the company. Court dockets show contract-related cases filed against Rotor X in federal court in Arizona during 2023.

Rotor X filed a Chapter 11 bankruptcy case in the District of Arizona in October 2023; the case was dismissed for failure to file required information and later closed. In January 2024, Aero-News Network reported that Rotor X announced a management transition and stated an intent to resume business operations.

== Current models ==
- RotorWay A600

== See also ==
- Homebuilt aircraft
