= MTT Turbine Superbike =

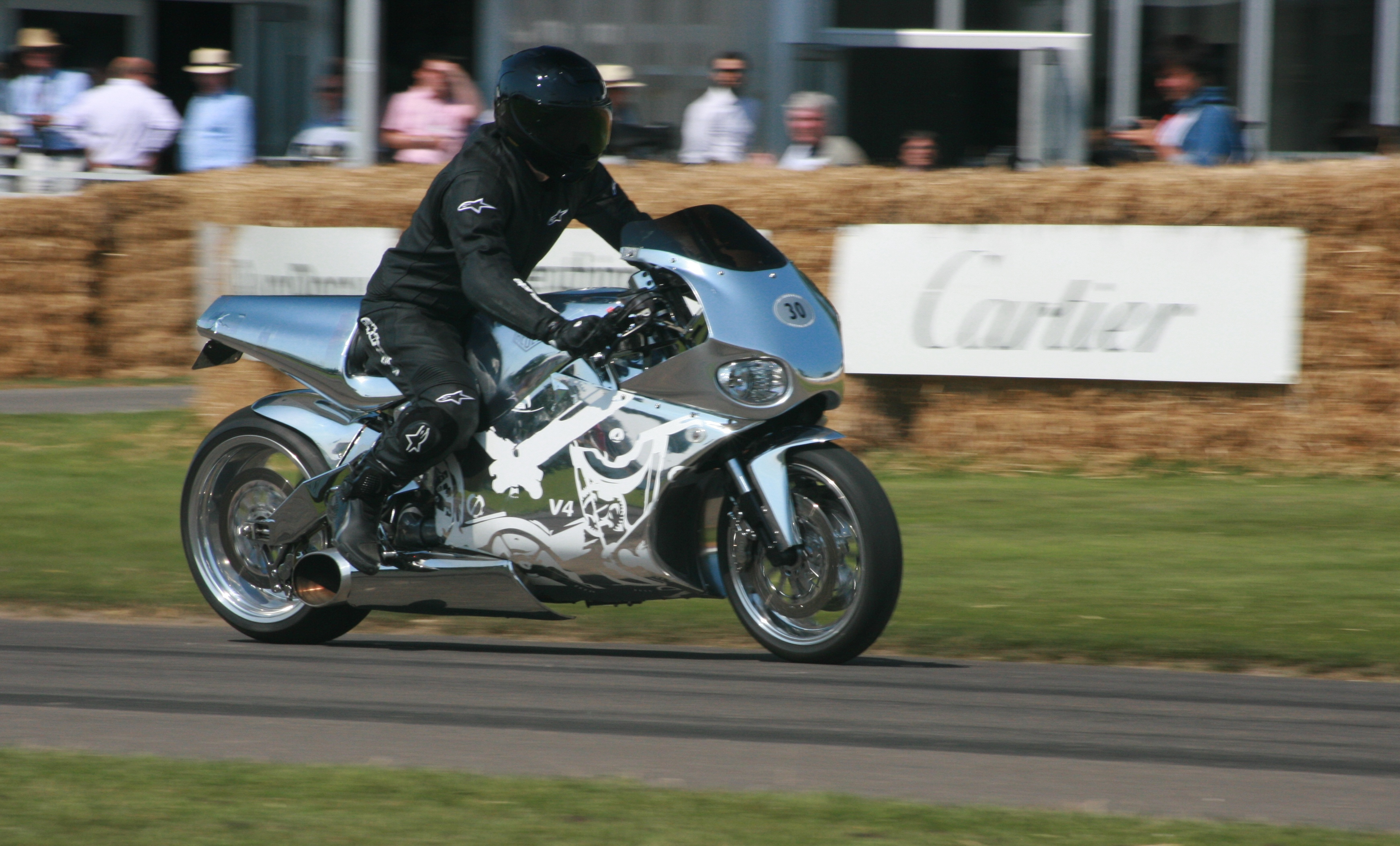
- Manufacturer: Marine Turbine Technologies
- Also called: Y2K Superbike
- Production: 2000–present
- Class: Sport bike
- Engine: 320 hp (240 kW) Rolls-Royce 250-C18 turboshaft 420 hp (310 kW) Rolls-Royce 250-C20B turboshaft
- Transmission: 2-speed automatic
- Suspension: mono shock adjustable, oleopneumatic, Öhlins
- Brakes: 320 mm discs, 4-piston Brembo calipers
- Rake, trail: 27 degrees
- Wheelbase: 68 in (1,700 mm)
- Dimensions: L: 2450mm
- Seat height: 840mm
- Fuel capacity: 34 L (7.5 imp gal; 9.0 US gal) (diesel, kerosene, or Jet A)

The MTT Y2K Turbine Motorcycle, also known as the Y2K Turbine Superbike, is an American motorcycle powered by a turboshaft engine, made by Marine Turbine Technologies since 2000. The bikes are not mass-produced in continuous series; each unique bike is hand made to order after receiving the buyer's specifications. Guinness World Records considers it as the most expensive production motorcycle.

== Development ==
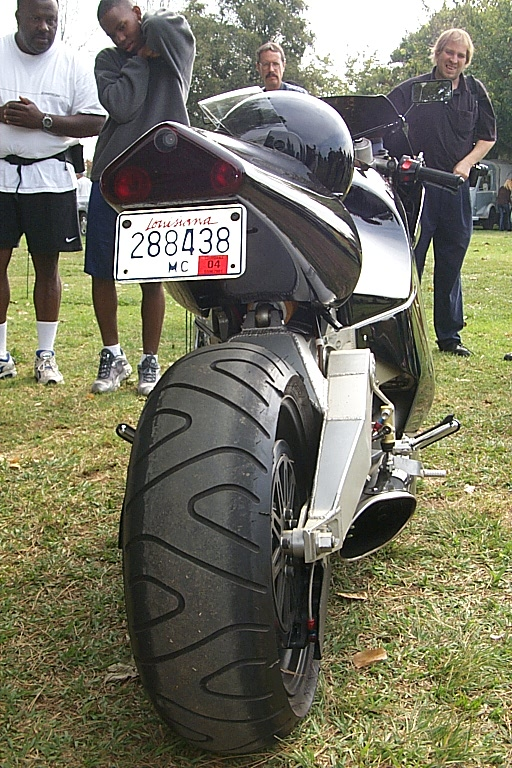
Rear view showing the wide rear tire and large bore exhaust (lower right)

When MTT president Ted Mclntyre decided to add a motorcycle to his firm's range, he appointed Christian Travert, a former bike racer and custom builder, to head the project. Early models were powered by a Rolls-Royce-Allison Model 250-C18 gas turbine producing a claimed 320 hp (240 kW) at 52,000 rpm. Unlike some turbojet-powered motorcycles which relied on jet propulsion for thrust, the Y2K Superbike's turboshaft engine drives the rear wheel via a two-speed gearbox and chain and sprocket. The motorcycles are produced on demand and made to order for buyers.

The turbines used in the motorcycles are second-hand, having reached the original manufacturer's mandated running time limit. MTT refurbishes the engines and extends a life-time warranty with the purchase of every bike.

A turbine engine can be easily run on a wide variety of fuels, and so like other turbine engines, the MTT Turbine Superbike does not require jet fuel to operate, since it doesn't have to handle the extremes of temperatures that jet fuel is modified to operate in without coagulating or waxing. MTT has fuelled the Y2K with diesel, kerosene and Bio-Fuel (all similar to jet fuel in composition). Thicker fuel is preferable because it has a higher energy content per unit of fuel, but a turbine can be run on gasoline or other flammable liquids just as easily, or even powderized fuel such as coal dust if a delivery system is set up for it.

== Variants ==
In 2006, MTT released the "Street Fighter," at the Las Vegas SEMA show. The Street Fighter began the standardization of the more powerful 420 hp (310 kW) turbine from the Allison 250-C20B engine.

In 2015, MTT released two new models. The first was a trike with the 420 HP turbine engine. It features the latest technology and enhanced safety features. The second new bike released by MTT is the 420-RR (Race Ready). The 420-RR is the most extreme bike that MTT produces based on technical advances, aerodynamics and Race Ready enhancements.

== Reaction ==
The Discovery Channel TV show Greatest Ever: Motorcycles ranked the Turbine Superbike the fourth greatest motorcycle, saying that it held a Guinness World Record for the world's fastest production motorcycle, and that it was also the most expensive.

Jay Leno, owner of the first "production" Y2K Turbine Motorcycle with serial number 002, said, "It really does scare you half to death, but it's great fun." Leno also said, "I've got to go with the Y2K Jet Bike as one of the all time sexiest. It's the most fun because it's a bike... and it's a jet, and because it's the best motorcycle ever for shutting up the Harley guys." Leno said at a traffic light, the heat from the bike's exhaust melted the bumper of the car behind.

Leno said that after he took delivery of his bike, development was ongoing and design changes were being made. At the time, he had ridden his MTT bike about 2,000 miles (3,200 km), more than anyone else. Some parts failed during this time, and Leno was supplied with new and redesigned alternatives to try out. McIntyre told Leno that the bikes would be sold only to select buyers, those he thought would take proper care of the turbine engine, which is warranted for life, and not get themselves killed.

Paul Garson praised its audacity. Men's Journal said it is, "One [of] the most awe-inspiring, innovative, and otherwise amazing designs. With production limited to five per year it's no wonder the MTT Turbine Superbike has become a revolution", in their feature article 'Perfect Stuff'.

John Burns, of Motorcyclist, said, "Under full power, tracks like a bullet train…and the strangest thing is the complete lack of vibration. You hear the turbine but don't feel the turbine, except for the fact that it's trying to smoothly compress all your vertebrae into one dense donut."

"It's bloody mad and extremely scary ... it feels like bungee-jumping, except with the bungee pulling you forwards and not upwards. The sheer sense of uncontrollable acceleration building and the wind noise rushing up to meet you", said John Cantlie of Motor Cycle News.

== See also ==
- List of motorcycles by type of engine
