= Anita Frew =

Scottish businesswoman (born 1957)

Dame Anita Margaret Frew DBE
- Born: 24 June 1957 (age 69)
- Education: University of Strathclyde
- Occupation: Businesswoman

Dame Anita Margaret Frew (born 24 June 1957) is a Scottish businesswoman and chairman of Croda and the first female chair of Rolls-Royce.

== Early life ==
Frew graduated from the University of Strathclyde. She also earned a master of research in Philosophy from the University of London.

== Career ==
On graduation she joined Royal Bank of Scotland, before moving to Scottish Provident where she was head of UK Investment.

Frew became Director of Corporate Development at WPP plc. She also founded an investor relations consultancy, Frew McMaster.

She progressed to become a non-executive director of various commercial organisations including WPP plc and Northumbrian Water as well as Non-Executive Chairman of Victrex and pro bono non-executive director roles in various artistic organisations, including the Donmar Warehouse and the Gate Theatre.

Frew was appointed Dame Commander of the Order of the British Empire (DBE) in the 2023 New Year Honours for services to business and the economy.

== Directorships ==
Frew is a non-executive director of: Lloyds Banking Group; Aberdeen Asset Management; Ansbacher Holdings; Securities Trust of Scotland; Northumbrian Water; Abbott Mead Vickers BBDO; STOS plc; The City of London Investment Trust Plc; Archant; and NXT Plc.

Frew is the first female chair of Rolls-Royce and an honorary graduate of the University of Aberdeen.
