= Optimized Systems and Solutions =

- Company type: Subsidiary
- Industry: Asset Optimization
- Founded: 1999
- Headquarters: Reston, Virginia, United States
- Parent: Rolls-Royce plc
- Website: www.o-sys.com

Optimized Systems and Solutions LLC (formerly known as Data Systems & Solutions) is a wholly owned subsidiary of Rolls-Royce plc, with offices in the US, UK, France and the Czech Republic. It was founded in 1999 as a joint venture between Rolls-Royce plc and Science Applications International Corporation (SAIC). In early 2006, SAIC exited the joint venture agreement, making Rolls-Royce plc the sole owner.

As of June 30, 2014 OSyS has merged with Aero Engine Controls (AEC), another subsidiary of Rolls-Royce, and changed its name to Rolls-Royce Controls and Data Services.

Optimized Systems and Solutions specializes in the delivery of decision-support systems to monitor and optimize high-value assets in the following markets:

- oil and gas,
- civil and defence aerospace,
- power generation,
- marine,
- nuclear,
- transport (road and rail).

== Markets, products and services ==
OSyS provides commercial off-the-shelf (COTS) products and associated support services which are intended to enable businesses in these markets to:

- increase availability and reliability of key assets,
- reduce in-service cost,
- reduce risk through enhanced compliance and protection.

Such assets include gas turbines, diesel engines, pumps, compressors and rail transport systems.

Integrated solutions provided by OSyS include:

- data acquisition and management,
- electronic flight bag EFB,
- enterprise asset management,
- compliance,
- equipment health monitoring (EHM),
- fuel optimization,
- fleet planning and forecasting,
- decision support,
- systems integration and high-integrity software.

OSyS also provides consultancy services in regulatory compliance and environmental health and safety.

OSyS solutions and services are claimed to translate data directly into actionable information surrounding a customer's high-value assets.

== Accreditation ==
The Quality Management System (QMS) of Optimized Systems and Solutions LLC, has been approved by Lloyd's Register Quality Assurance to ISO 9001:2000.
