= RotorWay RW133 =

Piston aircraft engine

- Type: Horizontally opposed piston aircraft engine
- National origin: United States
- Manufacturer: RotorWay International
- Major applications: RotorWay Scorpion

The Rotorway RW133 is a piston engine designed for use in helicopters and homebuilt aircraft.

== Design and development ==
The RW-133 was developed in 1979 as an all-new piston engine for amateur-built aircraft, including a new crankcase oil system. The helicopter version features a dry sump oil system and a turbocharger option increasing power to 160 hp (119 kW). All components of the engine are cast and manufactured at RotorWay Foundries, except the Mallory Ignition and Dell'Orto carburetor.

== Specifications (variant) ==
=== General characteristics ===
- Type: Four-cylinder air-cooled horizontally opposed piston engine
- Bore: 4 in (102 mm)
- Dry weight: 160 lb (73 kg) with propeller

=== Components ===
- Fuel system: Updraft carburetor with manual mixture control
- Fuel type: 80/87 avgas minimum
- Cooling system: Water-cooled

=== Performance ===
- Power output: 100 hp (75 kW) @2700rpm
