= Rolls-Royce RR500 =

Family of small gas turbine engines

RR500
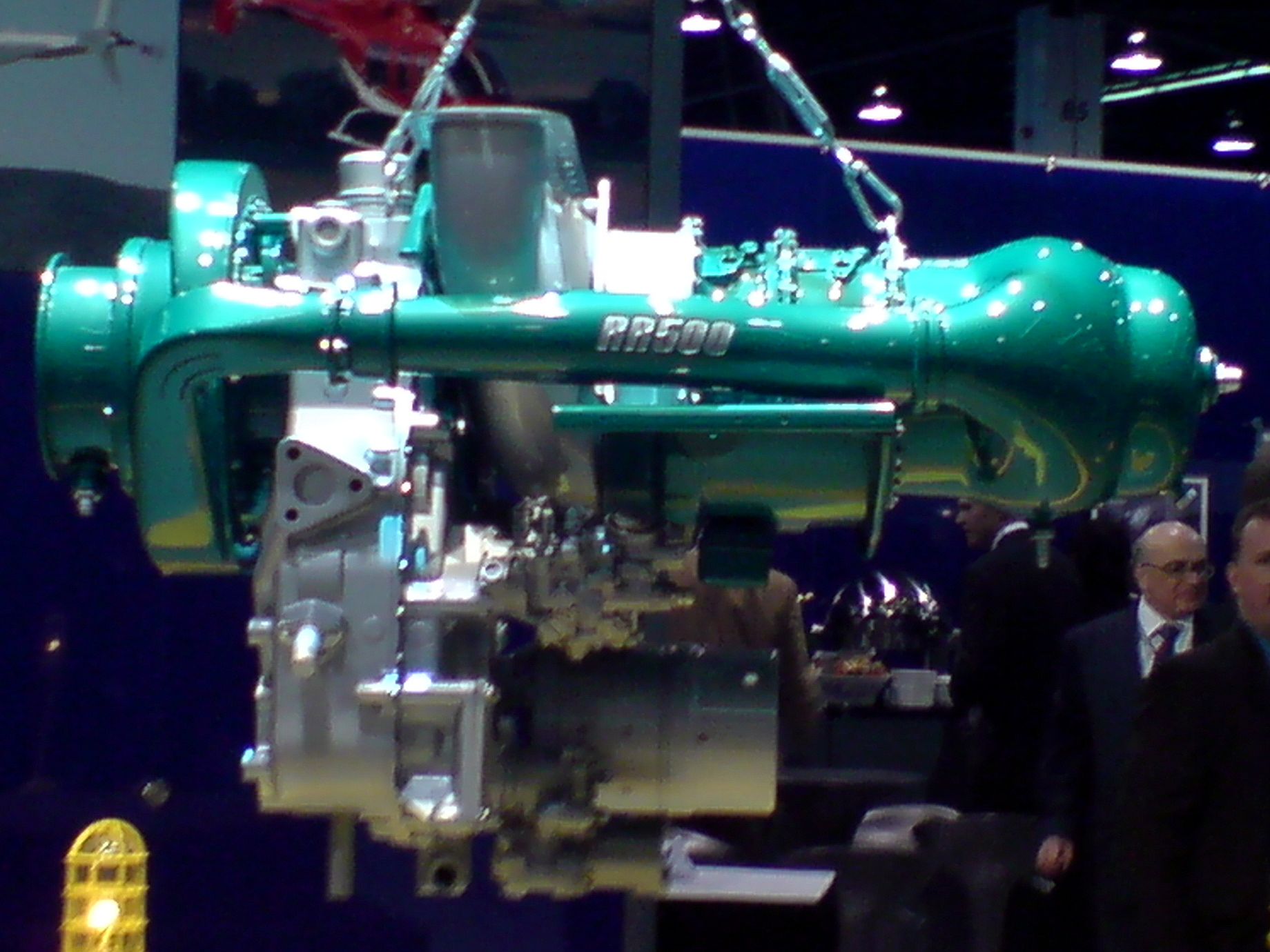
- The RR500TS was unveiled at Heli-Expo 2009.
- Type: Turboprop/turboshaft
- National origin: United States
- Manufacturer: Rolls-Royce Corporation
- Developed from: Rolls-Royce RR300

The Rolls-Royce RR500 is a family of small gas turbine engines developed by Rolls-Royce Corporation. The RR500TP turboprop variant was intended for use in small aircraft. The RR500TS was the turboshaft variant designed for light helicopters. Development of the RR500 was abandoned in 2012.

== Design and development ==
The RR500 is a larger derivative of the Rolls-Royce RR300 turboshaft, with the engine core scaled-up for increased power.

The basic weight of the engine with accessories is 250 lb (113 kg). The model produces around 500 shp (373 kW) for takeoff and can produce 380 shp (280 kW) in continuous use. Like its predecessor the Rolls-Royce Model 250 and all turbine engines (including the competing Pratt & Whitney Canada PT6), it is claimed to require less frequent maintenance than piston engines of similar power, albeit with the higher maintenance costs associated with turbine engines. A RR500TS turboshaft variant was also under development.

Development of the RR500 series ended in 2012.

== Variants ==
RR500TP
RR500TS

== Specifications (RR500 proposed) ==
Data from Rolls-Royce

==== General characteristics ====
- Type: Twin-spool turboprop
- Length: 43.1 inches (109 cm)
- Diameter: 23.4 inches (59 cm)
- Dry weight: 225 pounds (102 kg)

==== Components ====
- Compressor: Single-stage centrifugal

==== Performance ====
- Maximum power output: Take-off : 475 shaft horsepower (354 kW)

Maximum continuous: 400 shaft horsepower (300 kW)
Normal cruise: 350 shaft horsepower (260 kW)

- Overall pressure ratio: 7.5:1
- Fuel consumption: Take-off : 294.5 pounds (133.6 kg) per hour

Maximum continuous: 259.6 pounds (117.8 kg) per hour
Normal cruise: 236.95 pounds (107.48 kg) per hour

- Specific fuel consumption: Take-off: 0.620 pounds per horsepower-hour (0.377 kg/kWh)

Maximum continuous: 0.649 lb/(hp⋅h) (0.395 kg/kWh)
Normal cruise: 0.677 lb/(hp⋅h) (0.412 kg/kWh)

- Power-to-weight ratio: 0.474 pounds per horsepower (0.288 kg/kW)

== See also ==
- Rolls-Royce Model 250
- Rolls-Royce RR300

== Sources ==
- Flying (magazine), Vol. 135 Issue 11, Nov. 2008, p. 32, "Rolls-Royce Launches Turboprop for Small Airplanes"
