= Proxy board =

A proxy board is a requirement imposed under a Proxy Agreement by the U.S. Department of Defense's Defense Security Service on foreign investors seeking to acquire certain American companies. This is for national security reasons and applies mainly to defense contractors which are involved in highly classified contracts. The Proxy Agreement is between the foreign company, the US subsidiary holding classified contracts and the DSS.

A proxy board is a board composed entirely of American citizens which are responsible for the day-to-day running of the business. In this way the company's classified information is "insulated" from foreign exploitation but the parent company still benefits from any profits made by its subsidiary.

== Special Security Agreement ==
A variation is a Special Security Agreement (SSA) where the board of the company can be composed of both American citizens and nationals from the parent company's country. In this case when issues relating to national security are discussed only American managers may participate. SSAs require companies to be run under American law and by American citizens. In May 2006 the CEO of BAE Systems described the "firewalled" status of BAE's US subsidiary, BAE Systems Inc., " The British members of the corporate leadership, me included, get to see the financial results; but many areas of technology, product and programme are not visible to us.... The SSA effectively allows us to operate in the US as an American company, providing the highest levels of assurance and integrity in some of the most sensitive fields of national security provision."

== Examples of proxy companies ==
- Tyco Integrated Security and SimplexGrinnell: When the Swiss company acquired Tyco Integrated Security in 1997, and SimplexGrinnell in 2001.
- GEC/Tracor — When the British conglomerate GEC acquired the US defense contractor Tracor in 1998 it was required to establish a proxy board due to the highly classified nature of some Tracor contracts.
- Rolls-Royce/Allison — Rolls-Royce was required to establish a proxy board for its newly acquired subsidiary Allison in 1995. However the Department of Defense lifted this requirement in April 2000 and allowed Rolls-Royce to adopt the more flexible Special Security Arrangement.
- QinetiQ — UK defence technology company QinetiQ set up a proxy board to manage its US businesses in 2004 following the acquisitions of Foster-Miller Inc and Westar Aerospace and Defense Inc
