= Buford John Schramm =

Buford John Schramm (14 October 1938 – 27 April 2004), better-known as B.J. Schramm, was a businessman and developer of light personal helicopters. He was killed in the crash of a single-seat helicopter of his own design near Montour, about six miles southwest of Horseshoe Bend, Idaho. Schramm founded RotorWay Aircraft in 1961, a kit helicopter manufacturing company. At the time of his death he operated a company called Eagle R&D, based in Caldwell, Idaho, manufacturing a kit helicopter called the Helicycle.

Schramm was the founder of a non-ferrous metal foundry that supplied materials to Bell, Hughes, Sikorsky, Motorolla as well as his own helicopter businesses.

Schramm was posthumously inducted into the Experimental Aircraft Association Homebuilder's Hall of Fame in 2006, although he was not a member of that organization at the time of his death.

== External images ==
- Photo of B.J. Schramm in aeromorning.com archives
