= Rolls-Royce North America =

Subsidiary of Rolls-Royce plc.

- Type: Subsidiary
- Industry: Aeronautics
- Predecessor: Allison Engine Company
- Founded: 1999
- Headquarters: Reston, Virginia, United States
- Area served: North America
- Number of employees: 6,000 in United States; 1,000 in Canada
- Parent: Rolls-Royce
- Website: rollsroycenamerica.com

Rolls-Royce North America is a subsidiary of Rolls-Royce. The American unit operates under a Special Security Arrangement which allows it to work independently on some of the most sensitive United States defense programs despite its foreign ownership. It is involved principally with providing management direction and corporate support for all Rolls-Royce businesses and operations in North America, encompassing more than 7,000 employees at 66 locations across the United States and Canada. Its headquarters are in Reston, Virginia.

The most significant part of Rolls-Royce North America is "Rolls-Royce Corporation", formerly the Allison Engine Company. Other subsidiaries include:

- Rolls-Royce Canada
- Rolls-Royce Marine North America
- Rolls-Royce Defense Services
- Rolls-Royce North America Ventures
- Rolls-Royce Power Systems
- MTU America

== LibertyWorks ==
The Allison Advanced Development Company (also known as LibertyWorks) was established in 1995 as a result of Rolls-Royce's acquisition of the Allison Engine Company. As well as establishing a proxy board for Allison, Rolls-Royce was required to vest Allison's classified projects in Allison Advanced Development Company. In 2005, Rolls-Royce changed the name to Rolls-Royce North American Technologies.

== Notable employees ==
- Samuel L. Higginbottom – former chairman, president and CEO
- Marion Blakey – former president CEO
