= Fuel control unit =

Control system for gas turbine engines

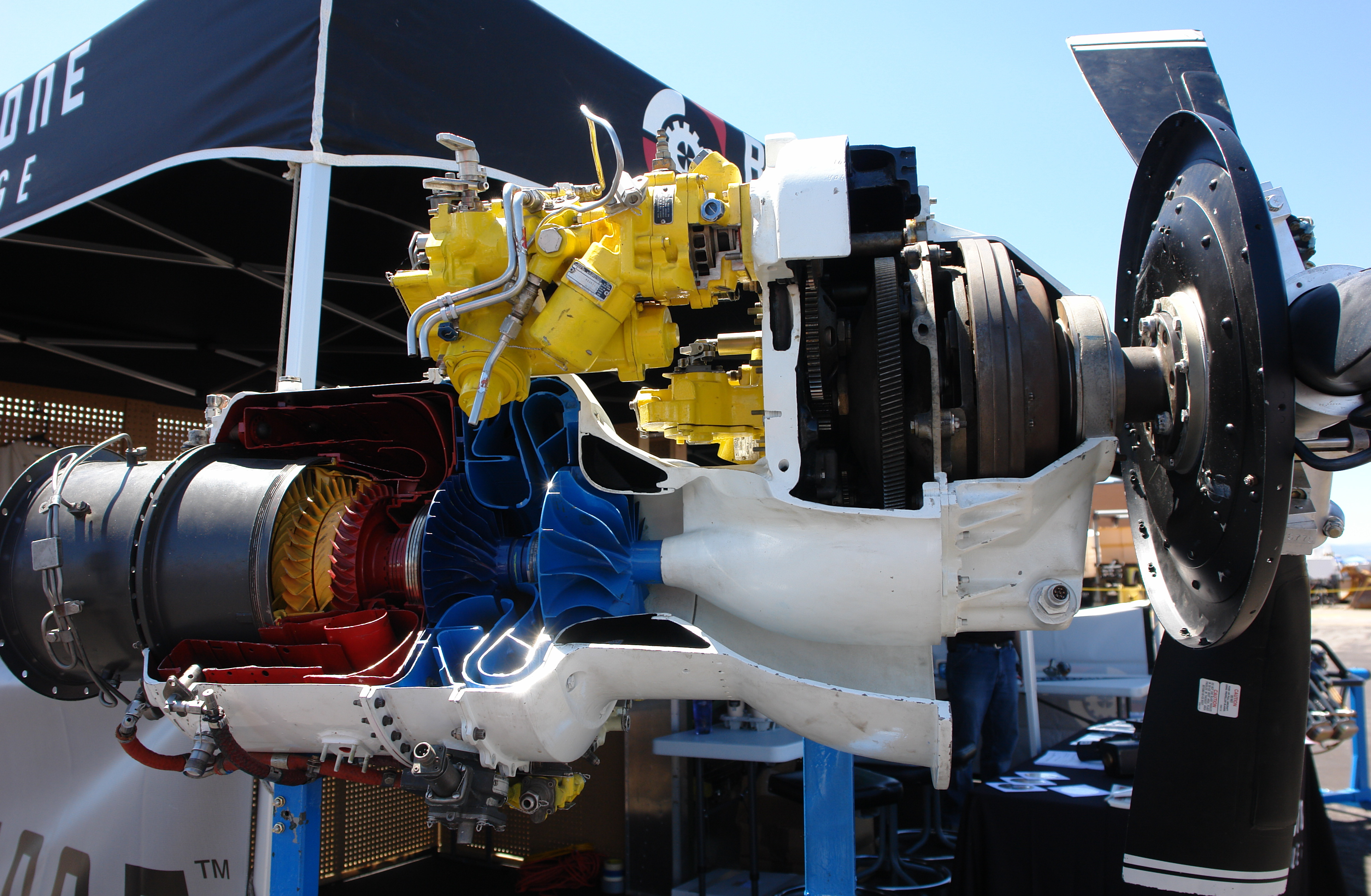
A cutaway of a Garrett AiResearch TPE-331 turboprop engine. The fuel control unit is the large yellow-painted component mounted on the rear of the gearbox.

A fuel control unit, or FCU, is a control system designed to control the delivery of fuel for gas-turbine engines.

== Fundamentals of turbine engine control ==
Gas-turbine engines are primarily controlled by the amount of fuel supplied to the combustion chambers. The very simplest fuel control for a turbine engine is a fuel valve operated by the pilot; this method of control was found on many pre-production models of early turbine engines (especially early turbojets), but it was soon found that this kind of control was difficult and dangerous in actual use. Closing the valve too quickly while trying to reduce power output could cause a lean die-out, where the airflow through the engine blows the flame out of the combustion chamber and extinguishes it. Another danger of excessive fuel is a rich blow-out, where soaking the fire with fuel displaces the oxygen and lowers the temperature enough to extinguish the flame. The excess fuel may then be heated on the hot tailpipe and ignite, possibly causing damage to the aircraft. For an aircraft engine, changes in airspeed or altitude cause changes in air speed and density through the engine, which would then have to be manually adjusted for by the pilot.

A fuel control unit solves these problems by acting as an intermediary between the operator's controls and the fuel valve. The operator has a power lever which controls the engine's potential (power, speed, or thrust), but does not directly control fuel flow. The fuel control unit acts as a computer to determine the amount of fuel needed to deliver the power requested by the operator.

== Types of fuel control units ==
Hydromechanical
Early gas turbines used flyweight governors and several mechanical sensors for compressor discharge pressure, burner pressure, and exhaust pressure. In some cases the engine's fuel pump is integrated in to the fuel control.
Electronic engine control (EEC)
An EEC is essentially a hydromechanical fuel control but with added electrical components to prevent overheating or overspeeding the engine. If the electrical part of the control should fail, an EEC will revert to a standard hydromechanical fuel control.
Full-authority digital engine control (FADEC)
A gas turbine with FADEC uses a digital computer which uses the engine's operating conditions and the power or speed requested by the operator to control the fuel valve using a servo motor. In this case, the power lever is only electrically connected to the fuel control.

== See also ==
- Index of aviation articles
- Compressor stall
- Jet engine
