= Province of Buenos Aires Railway =

Defunct Argentine railway company

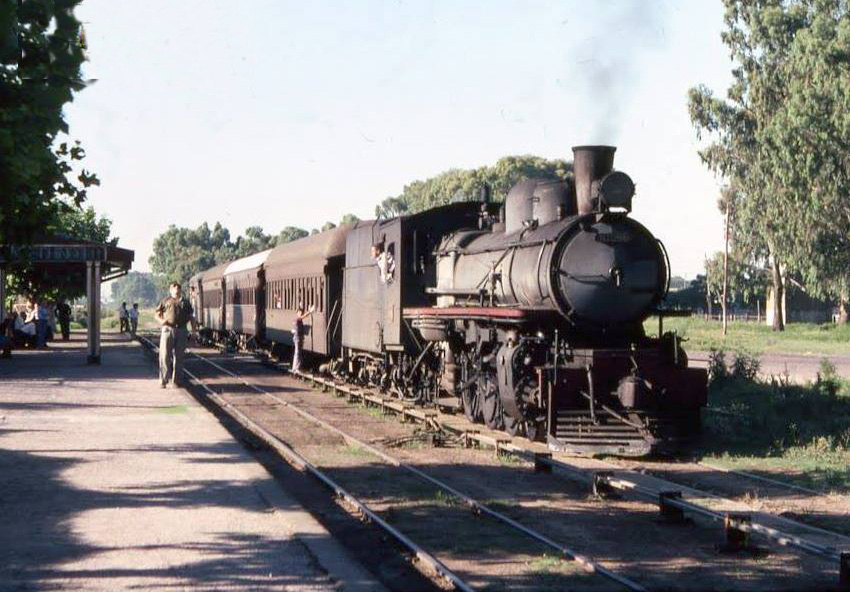
- Train pulled by a steam locomotive stopped in Monte Chingolo station, c. 1969

Overview
- Native name: Ferrocarril Provincial de Buenos Aires
- Status: Defunct company; rail line inactive
- Owner: Government of Buenos Aires Province
- Locale: Buenos Aires Province

Service
- Type: Inter-city
- Operator(s): FCPBA Company (1909–48); Ferrocarriles Argentinos (1948–92)

History
- Opened: 1912
- Closed: 1977; 49 years ago (passengers); 1992; 34 years ago (goods)

Technical
- Line length: 902 km (560 mi)
- Track gauge: 1,000 mm (3 ft 3 3/8 in)
Route map
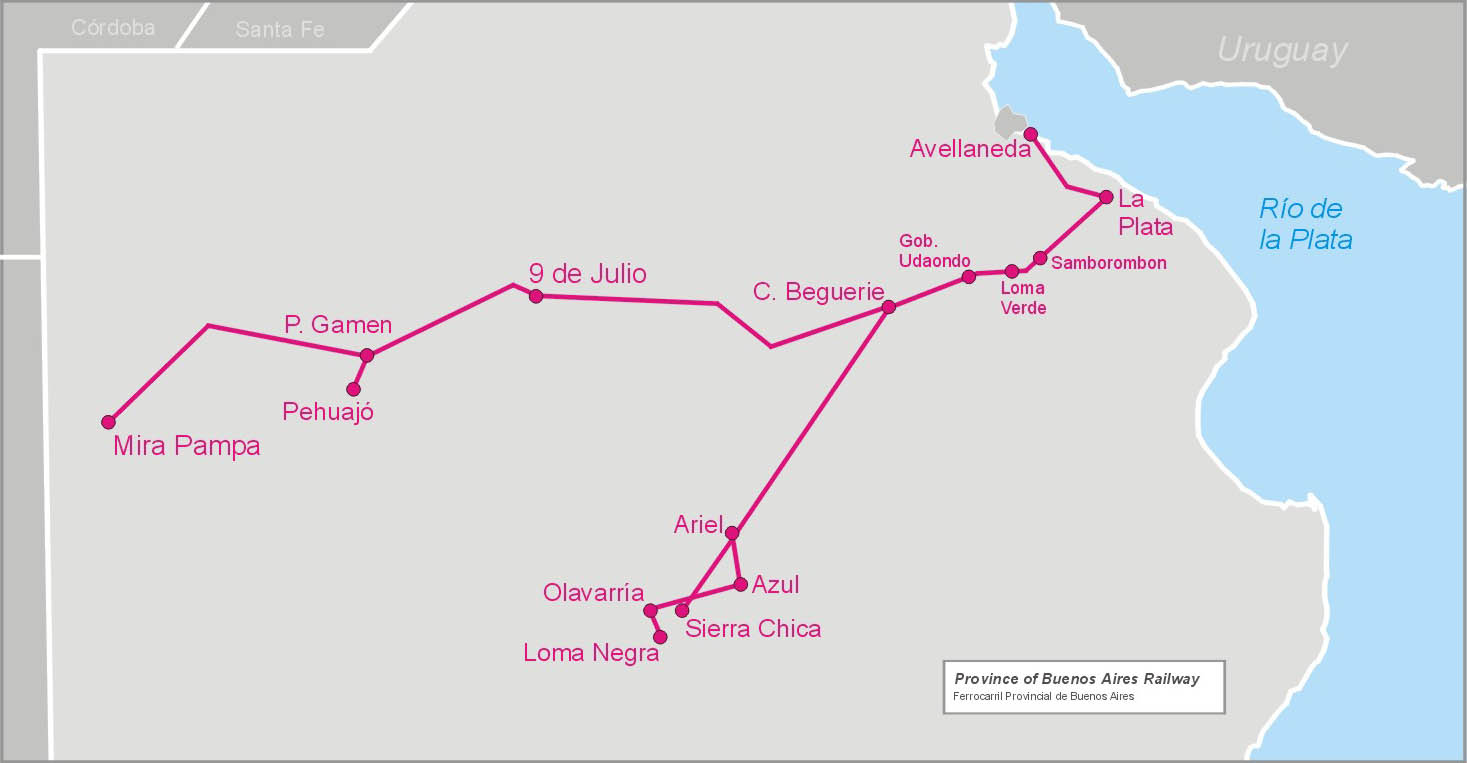

The Province of Buenos Aires Railway (Spanish: Ferrocarril Provincial de Buenos Aires – FCPBA) was a French railway company that operated a 902 km 1,000 mm (3 ft 3 3/8 in) metre gauge railway network in the Province of Buenos Aires in Argentina.

Founded in 1907 as the "Ferrocarril Provincial del Puerto de La Plata al Meridiano V", the company changed its name to FCPBA in 1924. After the 1948 nationalisation of the entire railway network, the line became part of the Belgrano Railway operated by state-owned company Ferrocarriles Argentinos. The FCPBA should not be confused with the similarly named French–owned Compañía General (CGBA, later "G" branch) which also operated in the Province.

== History ==
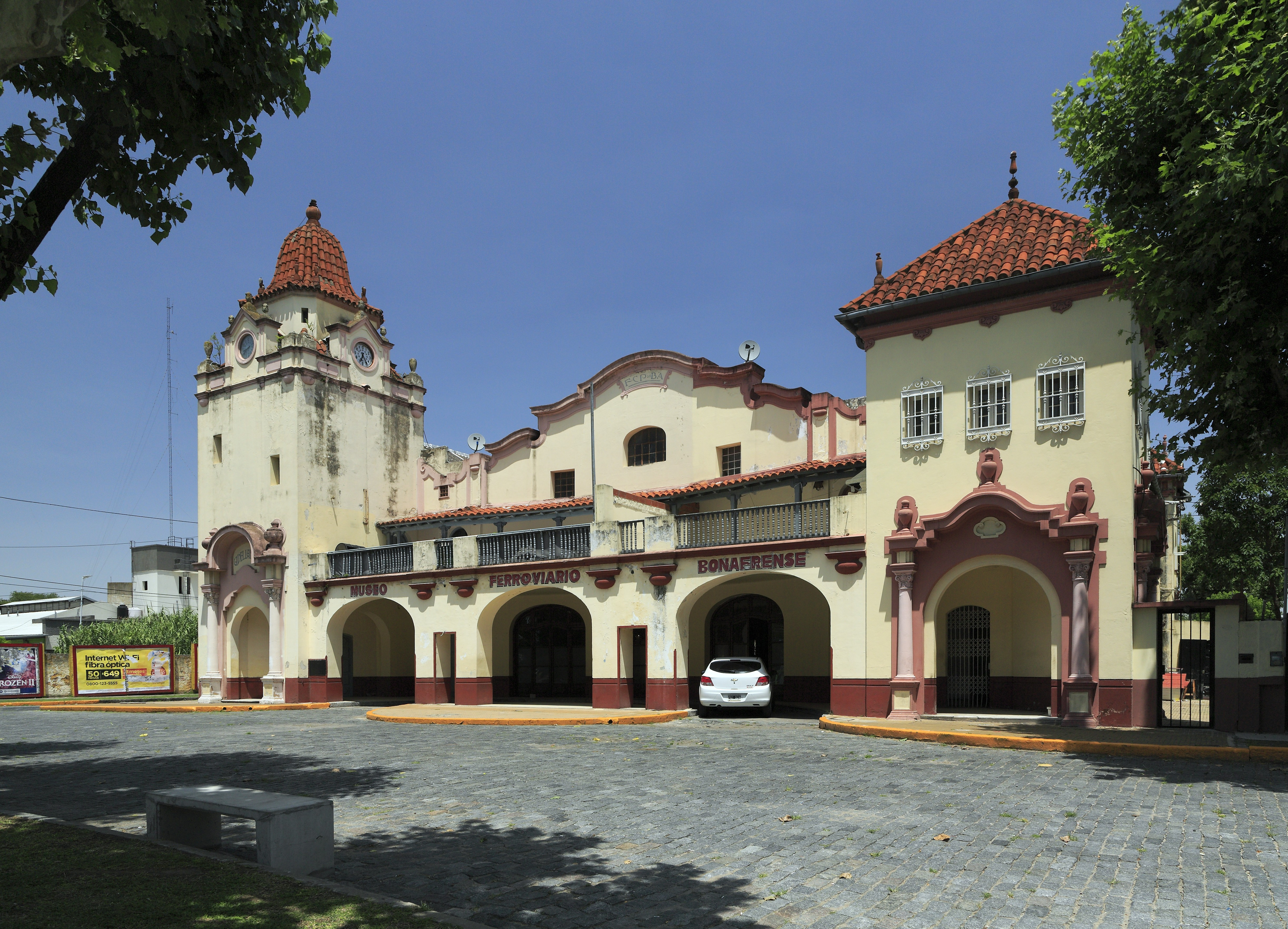
Avellaneda station, terminus of the line. It is a railway museum nowadays.

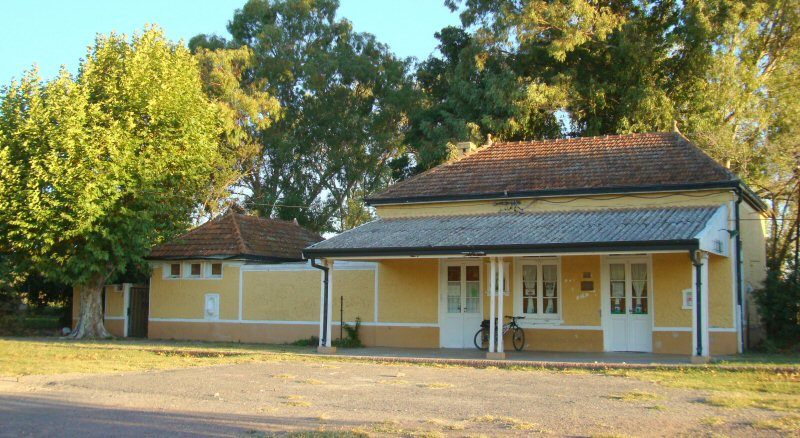
The well preserved Gorina building in 2009.

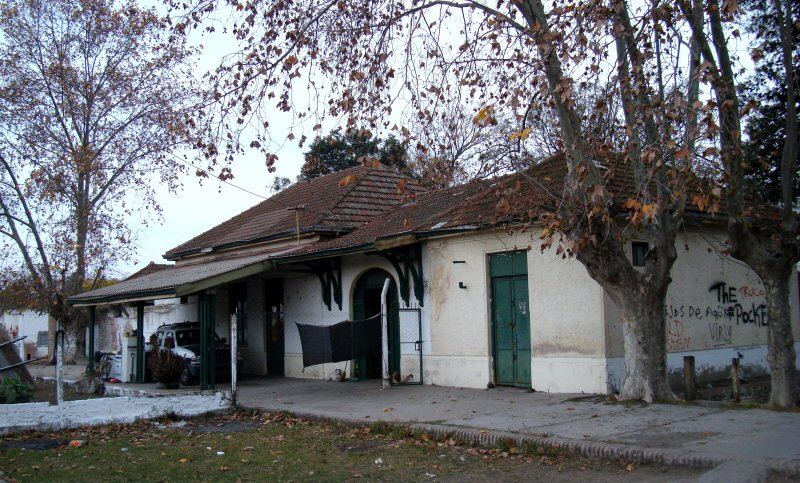
Gobernador Monteverde, one of the stops on the Avellaneda-La Plata line.

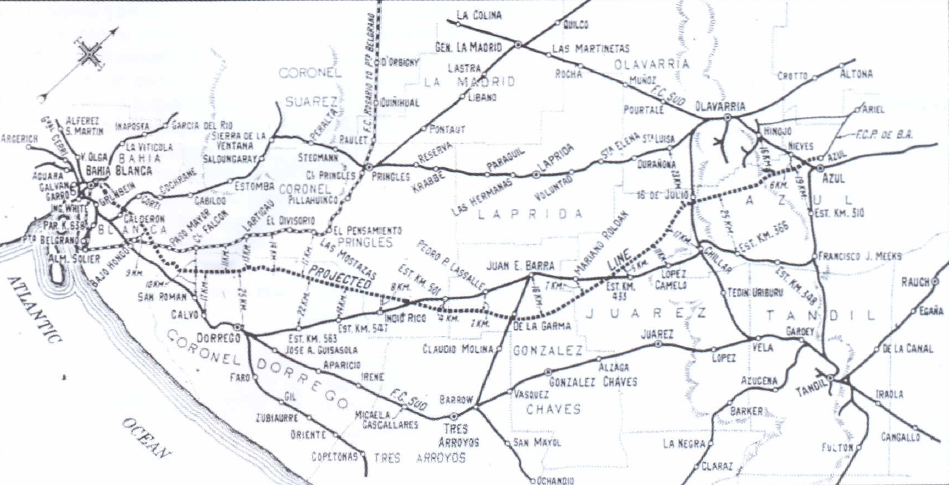
One of the lines projected (but not carried out) for the Ferrocarril Provincial, 1930.

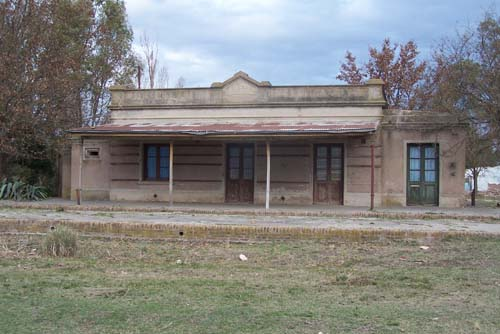
Ariel station, part of the branch to Olavarría.

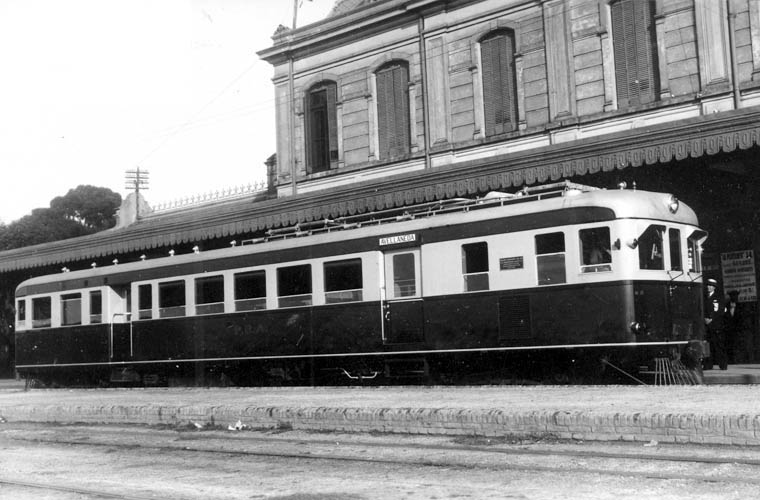
Sulzer railcars were added in 1935.

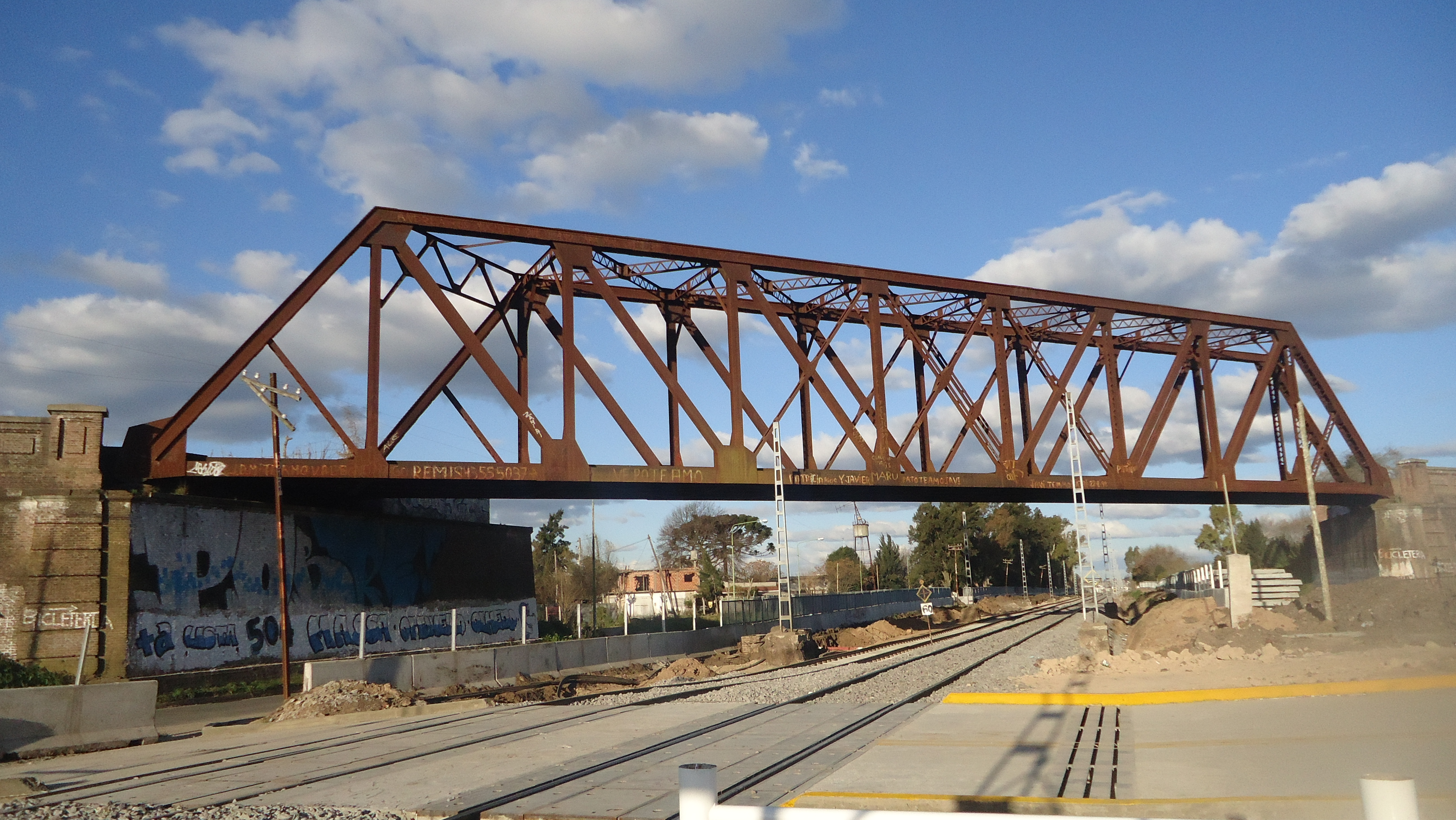
A cross between the FCPBA (over the bridge) and the Great Southern Railway.

=== Project ===
By the end of 19th Century, railway lines in Buenos Aires Province were managed by two British companies, BA Great Southern and Argentine Great Western. Together, both companies effectively had a monopoly, apart from fixing prices. In response to this situation, the Government of Buenos Aires considered how to run railway transport in the province which could work as a cost effective alternative to the British-owned ones.

In 1897, the government sanctioned the "Law of Agriculture and Economy Railway lines", allowing any person (pursuant to certain legal and technical requirements) to build 3 ft 6 in (1,067 mm) gauge railway lines. The Governor of Buenos Aires Province, Marcelino Ugarte, encouraged the construction of a regional railway line to compete against the dominant British companies. In his view, the presence of a more cost effective railway transport would force the British companies to decrease their prices to keep their position in the market.

A provincial decree promulgated in September 1904 ordered the construction of a railway line from Barracas al Sud to Carhué. This line was given to Buenos Aires Midland Railway in 1906. In March 1905 the other concession was given to French-owned Compañía General de Ferrocarriles en la Provincia de Buenos Aires. Both lines were to compete with Ferrocarril Provincial.

The lines to be built were determined as follows:

- Western line: From La Plata Port and Meridiano V, crossing the city of La Plata and Brandsen, Monte, Saladillo, 25 de Mayo, and 9 de Julio Partidos. This line had two branches:
  - A 270 km extension branch to Meridiano V, starting between a point to be determined between Monte and Saladillo stations.
  - Another branch from General Alvear to Olavarría.
- South line: From some point between Brandsen and Monte to Mar del Plata, crossing Ranchos, Chascomús, Pila, Rauch, Ayacucho and Balcarce partidos. This line would be split into three branches:
  - From Pila to Tuyú, crossing Dolores, Gral. Conesa and Gral. Lavalle.
  - From Mar del Plata to General Alvarado
  - From Mar del Plata to Azul or Olavarría (to be determined), crossing Balcarce and Tandil

The main offer to take on the project was from "Societe Anonime Franco-Argentine de travaux publics", a Franco-Belgian society headed by Otto Bemberg. The society was formed by Bemberg & Cia, Louis Dreyfus and Emili Erlanger & Cia, and Dirks & Dates.

=== Construction and development ===
In August 1907 authorisation was given for the construction of the line, originally named "Ferrocarril Provincial del Puerto de La Plata al Meridiano V". Construction began in La Plata in June 1909 and the sections of the line were progressively opened as follows:

Line	Opened	Km
La Plata to Saladillo Norte	12 Mar 1912	206
Saladillo Norte to Blas Durañona	1 Aug 1912	36
Blas Durañona to 9 de Julio	7 Feb 1913	66
9 de Julio to Km 440	21 May 1913	n/i
Km 440 (13 km) to Mira Pampa	7 Jan 1914	113

This completed a 553 km line with 31 stations and on 31 August 1916 the Provincial Government took over the operation of the railway. The first service ran on 17 March 1912. The only important town on the route was 9 de Julio (that was already served by the Western Railway). As time passed, new towns were established including Loma Verde, Etcheverry, Gobernador Udaondo, Carlos Beguerie, Hirsh, Fortín Olavarría, Roosvelt and Mira Pampa. Nevertheless, the railway did not make any profits due to floods or poor harvests.

The original project was incomplete with only the western branch being built. In 1913 another Law authorised the Government to build 4,000 km in railway lines in Buenos Aires Province as an expansion of the main line. The branches to be built were the following:

Projected lines
La Plata - Avellaneda and Mercado Central
Carlos Beguerie - Azul
C. Beguerie - Roque Pérez - Navarro - Mercedes - S.A. Giles - S.A. Areco - Zárate
Azul - Bahía Blanca
Azul - Mar del Plata
Azul - B. Juárez
Dolores - Gral. Conesa - Gral. Madariaga - San Clemente del Tuyú
Brandsen - Dolores - General Conesa - General Lavalle
El Trigo - Las Flores
25 de Mayo - Bragado - Junín
9 de Julio - Lincoln - Vedia
Vedia - Arenales - Rojas - Mitre - Santa Lucía - San Pedro

The line was officially opened on 7 January 1914, but was not opened to public until 17 May. In March 1912, under the Inocencio Arias administration, the "Sociedad Ferrocarril Puerto de La Plata al Meridiano V" was created but its first trade balance was negative due to the line was still incomplete. Moreover, as harvest season had finished, other rail companies had been commissioned to transport the harvest. In December 1913, the 1,435 mm (4 ft 8 1/2 in) Ferrocarril La Plata (a 23 kilometres (14 mi) tram built by the municipality of La Plata to transport cattle from this city to Abasto and inaugurated in 1902) was sold to the Province and subsequently added to Ferrocarril Provincial. By 1914, the company weended up with a surplus of $ 6.516,15.

In 1916, the provincial government (led by Marcelino Ugarte) took over the line. Nevertheless, diverse reasons (such as floodings, the World War I, wildcat strikes) caused the FCPBA showed a large deficit from 1915 to 1921, when Juan Bajac is appointed as manager of the company. Under his management, the company changed its name to "Ferrocarril Provincial" in 1924, also projecting lines to Olavarría, Azul, and Avellaneda. The FCPBA also acquired new rolling stock to modernise the line.

=== Exploitation and Expansion ===
The railway continue its expansion during the next years, reaching more towns in Buenos Aires Province. The cities joined by the train were as follows:

Line	Opened	Km
C. Beguerie to Azul	20 Jan 1927	68
Pedro Gamen to Pehuajó	10 May 1930	20
Ariel to Olavarría	6 Oct 1930	56
Tte. Cnel. Miñana to Sierra Chica	n/i	6,5
Olavarría to Loma Negra	1950s	17
Tte. Cnel. Miñana to Azul	1950s	30

On 14 November 1924 the name of the company was changed to "Ferrocarril Provincial de Buenos Aires" (abbreviated FCPBA).

In 1935 the company acquired four railcars to Swiss company Sulzer Brothers to run services on La Plata–Meridiano V line. The four units served throughout the Provicinal extension, running an average of 100,000 km per year. The line where the Sulzer vehicles ran most was Avellaneda–La Plata (54 km length covered in 65 minutes). Those railcars would be put out of circulation in the 1960s.

In 1936, the Provincial Government introduced a draft law with several proposes for the FCPBA, including three main options: 1) selling to the National government-, 2) agreements with other rail companies that served the same regions; 3) an improvement plan that included creation of urban centers in some stations, and settlement of adjacent areas, among others. The idea of selling the line was based on the excessively low prices, the proximity of other lines (from rival companies) serving the same regions, and the low profits during the 1926–35 period (with few exceptions). Finally, the third option was chosen.

In the mid-1940s the Provincial Government decided to nationalise the Ferrocarril Depietri that run from San Pedro and Arrecifes. Eduardo Depietri, owner of the line, refused to give his company but the Government revoked the concession in November 1949 alleging breach of contract and the railway was expropriated.

Nevertheless, the San Pedro-Arrecifes service would not run anymore because the FCPBA never showed interests in 68 km of pathways that were far away from its own line. On 31 December 1951 the company was transferred to state ownership as an independent entity under the control of the Empresa Nacional de Transportes (ENT) and in 1953 was absorbed by Ferrocarril General Manuel Belgrano, one of the six state-owned companies formed after the nationalisation of the entire railway network in 1948.

On 1 January 1954 the Ferrocarril Nacional Provincia de Buenos Aires (FNPBA) was formed by integrating the FCPBA, the CGBA and the Midland and was incorporated into the Ferrocarril Belgrano on 7 October 1957. Nevertheless, the merger was not beneficial to the Provincial so much of its rolling stock was taken off to serve Midland and Compañía General services, which had serious infrastructure problems.

The Ferrocarril Belgrano (whose tracks intersected with the Depietri's railway) nor took interest in taking over the expropriated railway. The abandoned structure was depredated and the remained assets were returned to Depietri's company in 1967. The tracks were dismantled, the lands sold and the rest was sold as scrap.

=== Decline and Closure ===
The lines between Etcheverry and Mira Pampa and Carlos Beguerie to Azul and Olavarría, together with their respective branch lines, were closed on 28 October 1961 during the Government of Arturo Frondizi. The line between Olavarría and La Plata was temporarily re-opened for freight traffic between April 1964 and 1968. The tracks between Carlos Beguerie and Mira Pampa were lifted in October 1974 and passenger services on the La Plata-Avellaneda were discontinued on 6 July 1977. Freight trains continued to operate on the line until the dissolution of the Belgrano Railway along with the entirety of Ferrocarriles Argentinos in the early 1990s.
