= Cicaré CH-2 =

CH-2
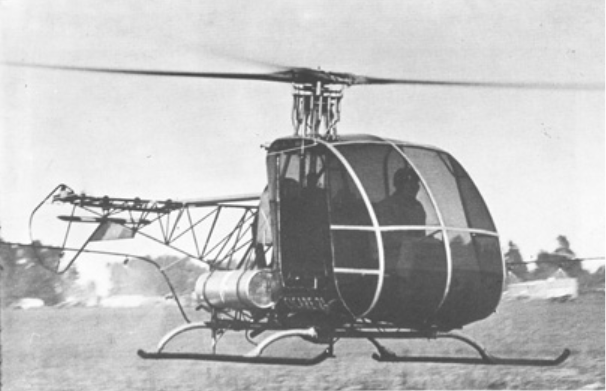

General information
- Type: General-use helicopter
- Manufacturer: Cicaré
- Designer: Augusto Cicaré
- Number built: 1

History
- First flight: 1964

The Cicaré CH-2 was a helicopter designed and built by Augusto Cicaré in Argentina in the early 1960s.

== Design ==
The CH-2 was a two-seat, single-engine helicopter whose airframe and tail boom was made from steel. The main rotor 3 three blades, and the tail rotor transmission was carried out through a shaft. The main transmission featured a 90° stage and belts stage.

== Specifications ==
Data from Augusto Cicare Helicopters CH.2 tech data

General characteristics

- Crew: one
- Capacity: one passenger
- Length: 8.45 m (27 ft 9 in)
- Width: 1.80 m (5 ft 11 in)
- Height: 2.35 m (7 ft 9 in)
- Empty weight: 390 kg (860 lb)
- Max takeoff weight: 690 kg (1,521 lb)
- Powerplant: 1 × Lycoming O-360 4-cylinder air-cooled horizontally-opposed piston engine, 135 kW (181 hp)
- Main rotor diameter: 7.30 m (23 ft 11 in)

Performance

- Maximum speed: 165 km/h (103 mph, 89 kn)
- Cruise speed: 135 km/h (84 mph, 73 kn)
- Service ceiling: 3,200 m (10,500 ft)
