= Revolution Mini-500 =

American kit helicopter

Mini-500
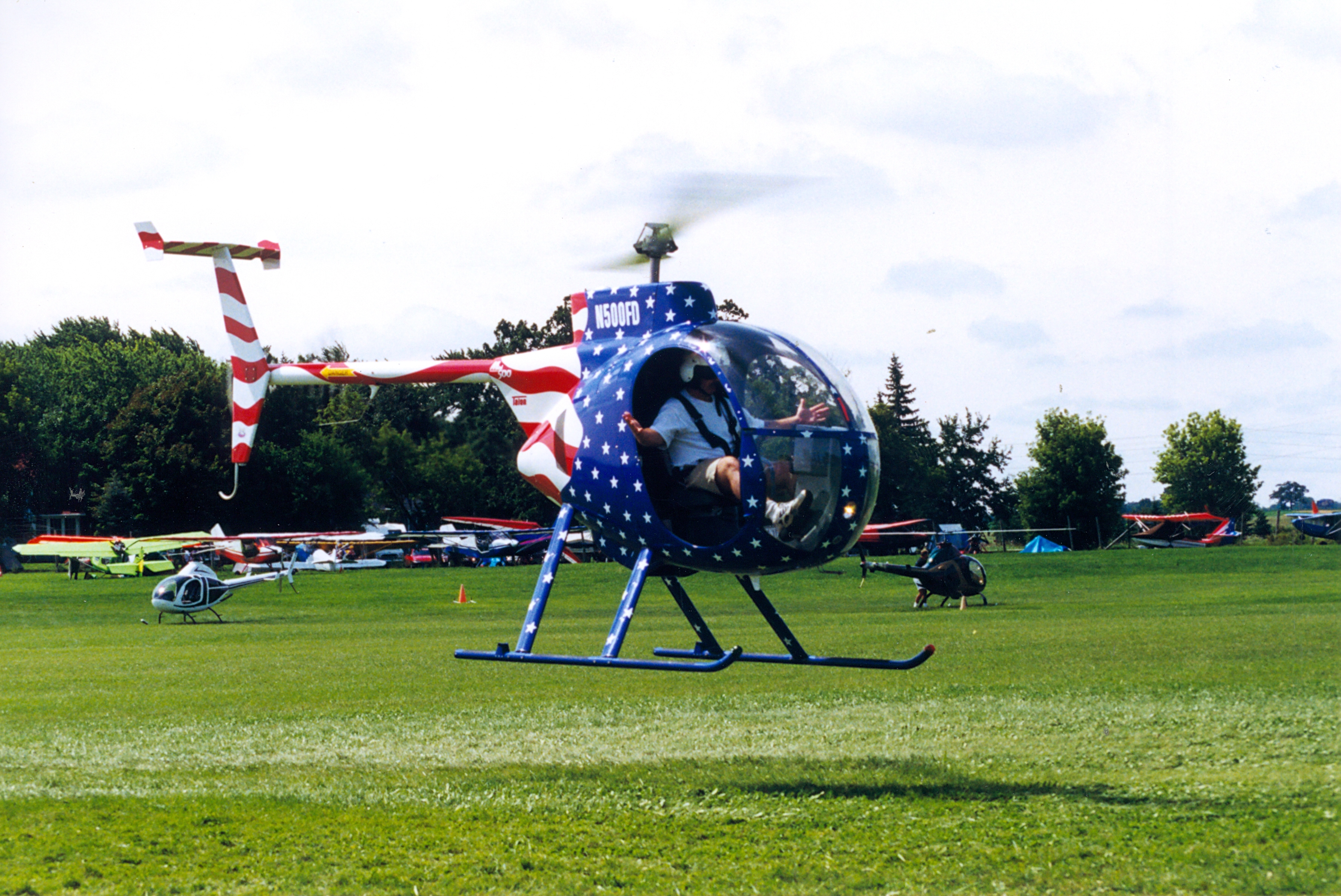
- A Mini 500 hands-off demonstration

General information
- Type: Single-seat light helicopter
- National origin: United States
- Manufacturer: Revolution Helicopter Corporation
- Status: Kit production completed November 1999
- Number built: 500 kits, about 100 completed and flown

History
- Introduction date: 1994
- First flight: 1992
- Variant: Millennium MH-1

The Revolution Mini-500 is a 1990s American single-seat light helicopter, designed and built by Revolution Helicopter Corporation as a kit for homebuilding.

Revolution Helicopter went out of business in November 1999 and kits are no longer available.

== Development ==
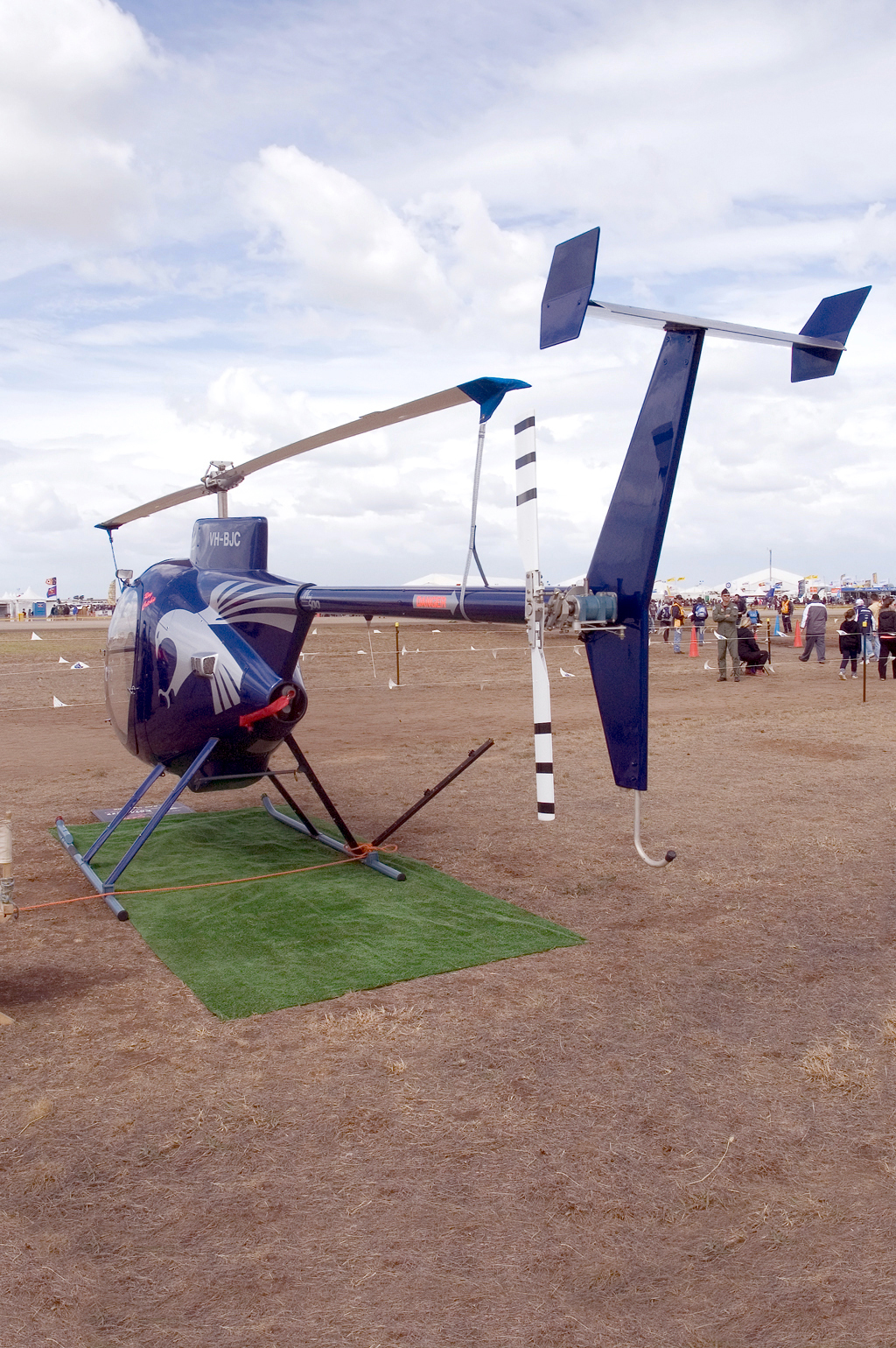
Revolution Mini-500, tail section view

The Mini-500 was designed as a light helicopter that resembles a scaled-down Hughes 500, powered by a Rotax 582 64 hp (48 kW) two-stroke engine.

The Mini-500 design was initially based upon Augusto Cicaré's control system design as incorporated in his CH-6 prototype helicopter, but company president Dennis Fetters and Cicaré were unable to agree on licensing terms. Fetters instead elected to design and patent a "newly improved control system".

The Mini-500 has a tubular steel fuselage with a foam and glass-fibre structure cabin. It has a two-bladed semi-rigid rotor and a conventional two-blade tail rotor. The first Mini-500 flew in 1992 and the company delivered the first production factory-assembled helicopter in July 1994. Production of kits ceased in 1999 and the company claimed that more than 500 had been sold.

The factory advertised the kits, saying: "no machining, welding or cutting is required and the package includes pre-drilled guide holes for easy alignment during construction ... pre-fabricated, lightweight superstructure with all complicated components pre-assembled at the factory, i.e., upper main transmission/reduction with rotor head, instrumentation panel, and tail rotor gear box assembly)." Also included in the kit were the composite cabin structure, doors, transmission cover and horizontal stabilizer.

The initial kit price was US$24,500 and included the Rotax 582 powerplant, fiberglass enclosure, basic instrumentation, electric starter, landing lights and navigation lights. The components came pre-painted in a variety of optional colors. The composite tail and main rotor blades were advertised as “lifetime on condition", indicating no fixed lifespan. Assembly time was advertised as 40 hours.

After Revolution Helicopter ceased operations, there was an attempt in 2003 led by Richard Stitt and Stitt Industries, Inc. to restart production of the Mini-500. The company started providing replacement engines to existing Mini-500 owners to replace the under-powered Rotax 582s and intended to produce new Mini-500s. Initial intentions were that it would be powered by a Mazda Wankel engine, but this was abandoned and plans shifted to the Solar T62 turbine engine. There is no indication that Stitt delivered any aircraft kits.

== Operational use ==
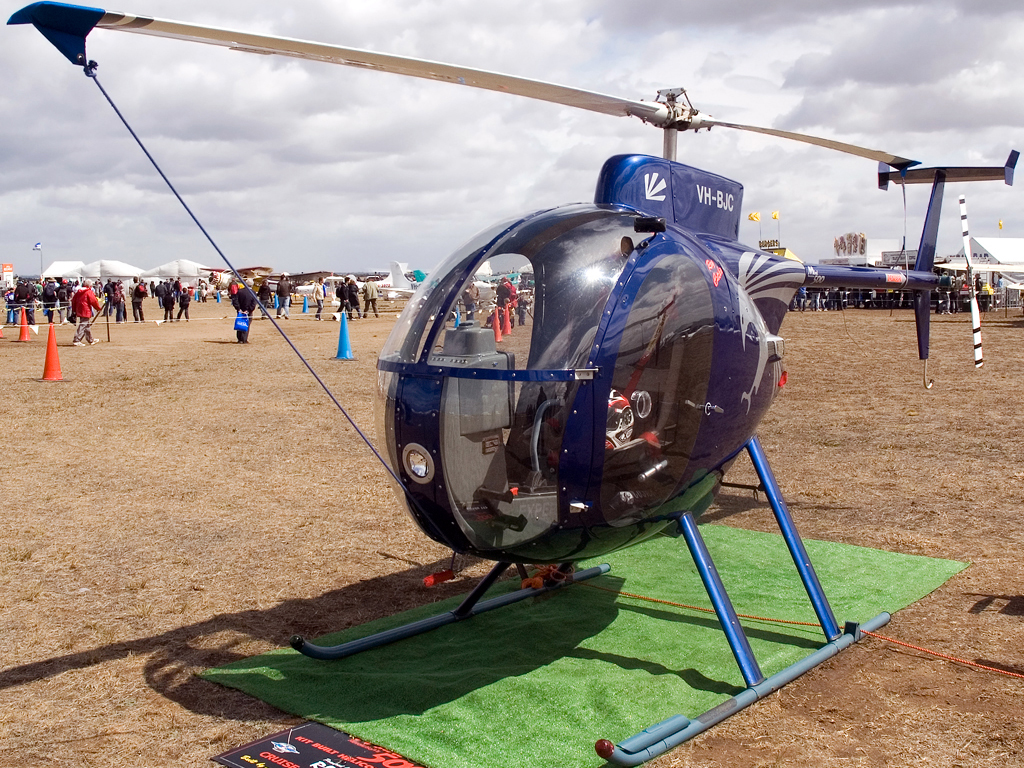
Revolution Mini-500

It is unclear how many Mini-500s have been built, with the company claiming to have sold over 500 Mini-500s kits with more than 400 built and flown, it has also been claimed by critics that no more than 100 have been actually built and flown. On 10 February 2010, 172 Mini-500s remained on the Federal Aviation Administration registry, with an additional 81 registrations cancelled (although registered, this does not necessarily indicate these aircraft have flown).

Of those that did fly there were many component failures, dozens of accidents and incidents and nine fatalities. The aircraft quickly developed a poor safety reputation and this curtailed kit sales.

The Rotax 582 two stroke engine proved to be underpowered in this application and many failed in flight. The engine's vibration levels also proved to be a problem as they, combined with excessive rotor vibrations, led to cracked frames and other component failures.

Owners complained that the aircraft was not well designed. The president of the International Experimental Helicopter Association, the Mini-500 aircraft type club, Bill Phillips, who completed a kit, but did not fly it stated: "You can tell it is junk just by looking at it" and described Revolution Helicopter Corporation president Dennis Fetters as "one of the biggest cons that’s ever hit the kit industry".

Fetters strongly denied that the design had safety issues and issued statements indicating that all accidents were due to improper maintenance, failure of builders to carry out rotor tracking and balancing or lack of piloting skills. In response to customer complaints in 1998 Fetters did add a tuned exhaust system to increase engine output, stronger transmission gears and a mast support kit to reduce vibrations.

=== Rotax 582 ===
Engine manufacturer Rotax warns owners of the 582 engine in the Owners Manual about its limitations:

"This engine, by its design, is subject to sudden stoppage. Engine stoppage can result in crash landings, forced landings or no power landings. Such crash landings can lead to serious bodily injury or death ... This is not a certificated aircraft engine. It has not received any safety or durability testing, and conforms to no aircraft standards. It is for use in experimental, uncertificated aircraft and vehicles only in which an engine failure will not compromise safety. User assumes all risk of use, and acknowledges by his use that he knows this engine is subject to sudden stoppage ... Never fly the aircraft equipped with this engine at locations, airspeeds, altitudes, or other circumstances from which a successful no-power landing cannot be made, after sudden engine stoppage. Aircraft equipped with this engine must only fly in DAYLIGHT VFR conditions."

This statement is supported by the 16 fatalities when operating the Mini 500.

== Variants ==
Mini-500
Original version, empty weight 330 lb (150 kg)
Mini-500B
Improved model with upgraded tail rotor tips, main transmission, rotorhead and airframe. Empty weight 485 lb (220 kg)

== Specifications ==
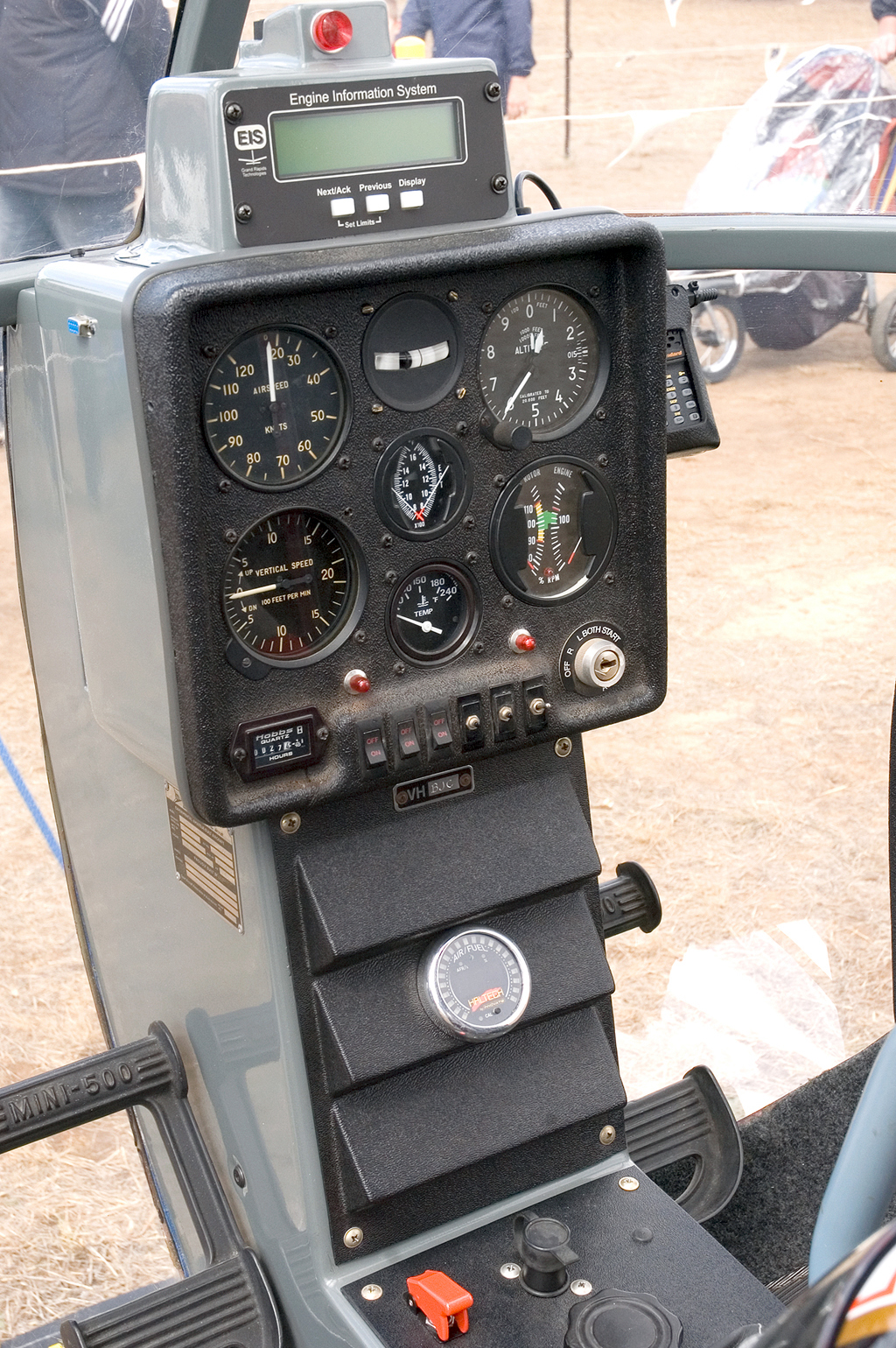
Revolution Mini-500 instrument panel

Data from Taylor and Southeast Recreational Helicopters

General characteristics

- Crew: 1
- Length: 22 ft 6 in (6.9 m)
- Width: 5 ft 3 in (1.6 m)
- Height: 8 ft 1 in (2.5 m)
- Empty weight: 330 lb (150 kg)
- Gross weight: 820 lb (372 kg)
- Powerplant: 1 × Rotax 582 piston engine , 64 hp (48 kW)
- Main rotor diameter: 19 ft 0 in (5.79 m)

Performance

- Maximum speed: 115 mph (186 km/h, 100 kn)
- Cruise speed: 75 mph (122 km/h, 65 kn)
- Range: 225 mi (361 km, 196 nmi)
- Endurance: 3 hours 0 minutes
- Service ceiling: 10,000 ft (3,050 m)
- Rate of climb: 1,100 ft/min (5.6 m/s)

Related lists

- List of single seat helicopters
