= Cicaré CH-1 =

CH-1
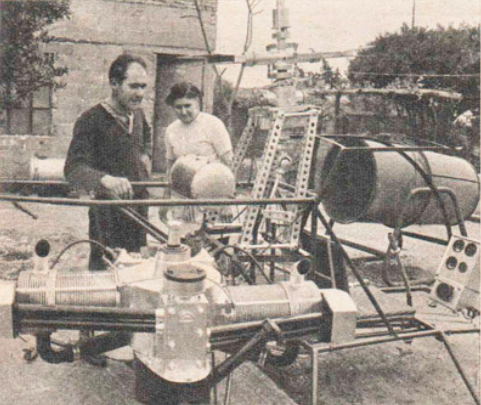
- Augusto Cicaré and his mother with the CH-1.

General information
- Type: Experimental helicopter
- Manufacturer: Cicaré
- Designer: Augusto Cicaré
- Number built: 1

History
- First flight: 1961

The Cicaré CH-1 was a helicopter designed and built by Augusto Cicaré in Argentina in the early 1960s.

== Design ==
The CH-1 was a single-seat, single-engine helicopter driving two counter-rotating co-axial rotors, each featuring two blades. The airframe of the helicopter was made entirely from steel. The inclination of the rotors' axis was dictated by the cyclic control of the CH-1.

== Specifications ==
Data from Augusto Cicare Helicopters CH.1 tech data

General characteristics

- Crew: one
- Length: 6.80 m (22 ft 4 in)
- Width: 1.60 m (5 ft 3 in) fuselage
- Height: 2.15 m (7 ft 1 in)
- Empty weight: 225 kg (496 lb)
- Max takeoff weight: 330 kg (728 lb)
- Powerplant: 1 × Cicare 1.8 4-cylinder air-cooled horizontally-opposed piston engine, 44.7 kW (59.9 hp)
- Main rotor diameter: 2 × 6.0 m (19 ft 8 in) 2-bladed counter-rotating co-axial rotors

Performance

- Cruise speed: 90 km/h (56 mph, 49 kn)
- Never exceed speed: 120 km/h (75 mph, 65 kn)
- Service ceiling: 1,500 m (4,900 ft)
- Rate of climb: 7 m/s (1,400 ft/min)
