= Viña, Buenos Aires =

Viña
- Town
- Location within Buenos Aires Province
- Coordinates: 33°59′S 60°14′W
- Country: Argentina
- Province: Buenos Aires
- Partidos: Arrecifes
- Established: 1882
- Elevation: 48 m (157 ft)

Population (2001 Census)
  - Total: 483
- Time zone: UTC−3 (ART)
- CPA Base: B 2754
- Climate: Dfc

Viña is a town located in the northern edge of the Arrecifes Partido in the province of Buenos Aires, Argentina.

== Geography ==
Viña is located 193 km (120 mi) from the city of Buenos Aires. Viña is one of three towns located within the Arrecifes Partido, the others being the regional center of Arrecifes, and the town of Todd.

== History ==
Viña was founded in 1882, following the construction of a railway station operated by the General Bartolomé Mitre Railway. Passenger rail service serving the town would last until 1992, a century later.

== Population ==
According to INDEC, which collects population data for the country, the town had a population of 827 people as of the 2001 census.
