= Cicaré CH-8 =

CH-8 UL/CH8
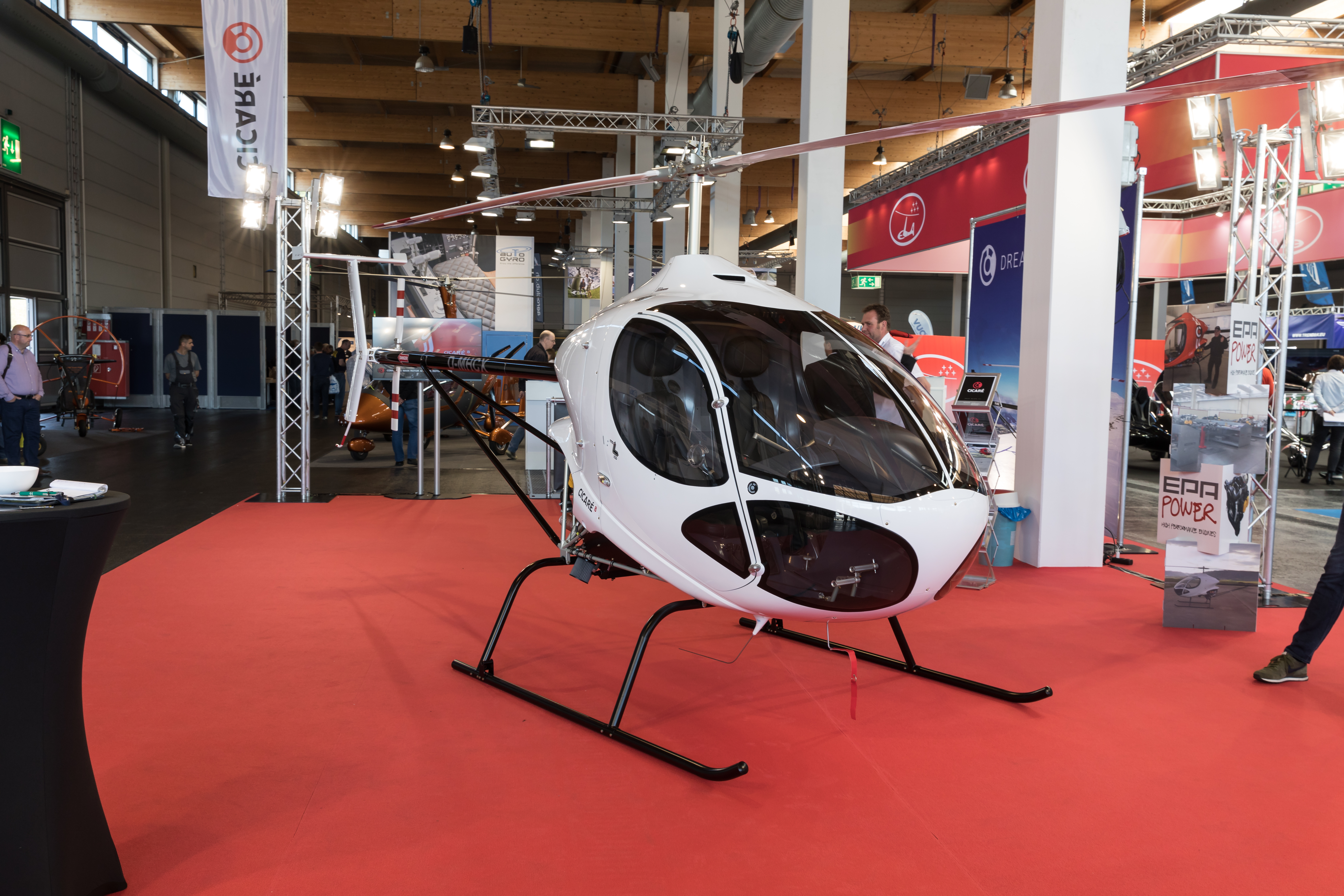
- CH-8 UL

General information
- Type: Ultralight kitbuilt helicopter
- National origin: Argentina
- Manufacturer: Cicaré
- Status: Operational
- Number built: 100 by July 2021

History
- Manufactured: 100
- Introduction date: 2014
- First flight: 2013
- Developed from: Heli-Sport CH-7

The Cicaré CH-8 is a series of ultralight, kit-built helicopters based on a single-seat Argentinian design from the late 1980s. It was later developed into a tandem two-seater, and later into a side by side ULM and remains in production.

== Design and development ==
The piston engine-powered CH-8 ultralight series use the traditional "penny-farthing" layout with two-bladed main and tail rotors. The main rotor is formed from composites and is a teetering, semi-rigid design with 6° of twist. The pod-and-boom fuselage has a carbon fiber and epoxy resin cabin with a long transparent forward-opening canopy. This large windshield allows the pilot to see the tip of the skid making easier to get a ground reference while landing. The frame is built on aeronautical SAE 4130 chrome molybdenum steel tube and welded in spatial reticulated configuration. The steel frame also carries the engine, semi-exposed behind the accommodation and connected to the main rotor shaft by a belt drive. A slender aluminium boom, strengthened by a pair of long struts to the lower fuselage frame, carries both the tail rotor and swept fins. The upper fin is topped with a short horizontal T-shaped tailplate, with small endplate fins, and the lower one ends with a tailskid.

== Operational history ==
100 Helis were built between 2014 and 2021.

== Specifications (CH-8) ==
Data from Jane's All the World Aircraft 2010/11

General characteristics

- Crew: one
- Capacity: one passenger
- Length: 6.920 m (45 ft 4.8 in)
- Height: 2.7 m (17 ft 8 in)
- Empty weight: 280 kg (617 lb)
- Max takeoff weight: 480 kg (1,058 lb)Endurance: 2.5 hrs
- Powerplant: 1 × Rotax EPA R917 Ti , 101 kW (135 hp)
- Main rotor diameter: 6.40 m (21 ft 0 in)

Performance

- Cruise speed: 150 km/h (93 mph, 81 kn)
- Never exceed speed: 194 km/h (121 mph, 105 kn)
- Range: 375 km (233 mi, 202 nmi) with standard fuel load
- Endurance: 2.5 hrs
- Service ceiling: 4,500 m (14,800 ft) service; hover ceiling out of ground effect is 2,500 m (8,200 ft)
- Rate of climb: 7 m/s (1,400 ft/min)

== See also ==
- Mosquito Aviation XE
- Homebuilt aircraft
