= Cicaré CK.1 =

Light helicopter

CK.1
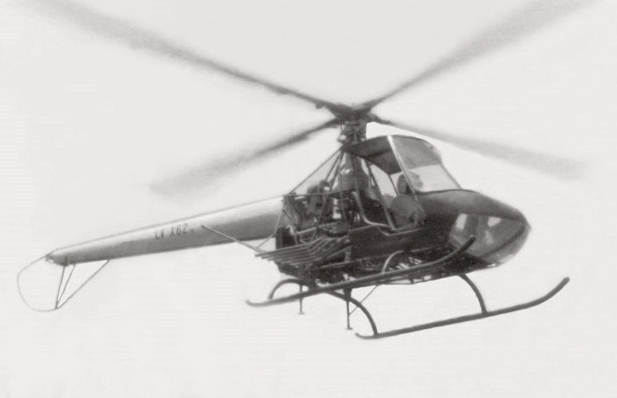

General information
- Type: Utility helicopter
- Manufacturer: Cicaré
- Designer: Augusto Cicaré
- Number built: 1 (+5?)

History
- First flight: September 1976

The Cicaré CK.1 (originally, the CH.III Colibrí) was a light helicopter developed in Argentina in the 1970s. It was a small, single-rotor aircraft of pod-and-boom configuration with a fully enclosed bubble canopy that could seat three people side-by-side. Cicaré's previous helicopter designs had attracted the attention of the Argentine Air Force, which in 1974 contracted him to develop a light helicopter for training and also marketed for agricultural use. A prototype, registered LV-X62 flew in September 1976, and the Air Force placed an order for five pre-production machines. However, development was terminated at this point.

== Specifications ==
General characteristics

- Crew: one pilot
- Capacity: 2 passengers
- Length: 8.53 m (28 ft 0 in)
- Height: 8.53 m (28 ft 0 in)
- Empty weight: 469 kg (1,034 lb)
- Gross weight: 800 kg (1,764 lb)
- Powerplant: 1 × Cicaré 4C-27 , 149 kW (200 hp)
- Main rotor diameter: 7.60 m (24 ft 11 in)
- Main rotor area: 43.8 m^{2} (471 sq ft)

Performance

- Maximum speed: 163 km/h (101 mph, 88 kn)
- Range: 480 km (298 mi, 259 nmi)
- Service ceiling: 3,900 m (12,800 ft)

== See also ==
- Cicaré CH-14
