= Depietri Railways and Elevators =

Former Argentine railway company (1936–1948)

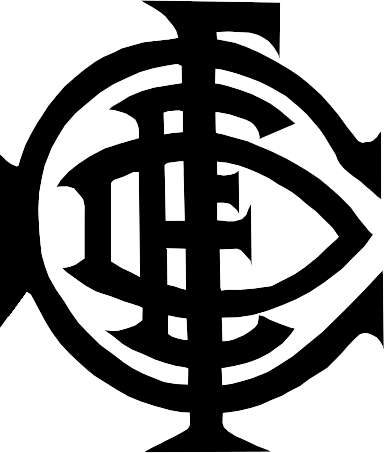

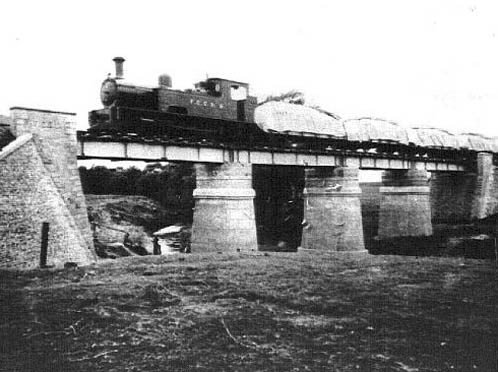
- Train crossing the Río Tala, near San Pedro

Overview
- Native name: Ferrocarriles y Elevadores Depietri
- Status: Defunct company; railtracks lifted
- Owner: Buenos Aires Province
- Locale: Argentina
- Termini: San Pedro; Arrecifes

Service
- Type: Inter-city

History
- Opened: 1936
- Closed: 1948; 77 years ago

Technical
- Line length: 68 km (42 mi)
- Track gauge: 1,000 mm (3 ft 3 3/8 in)
Route map
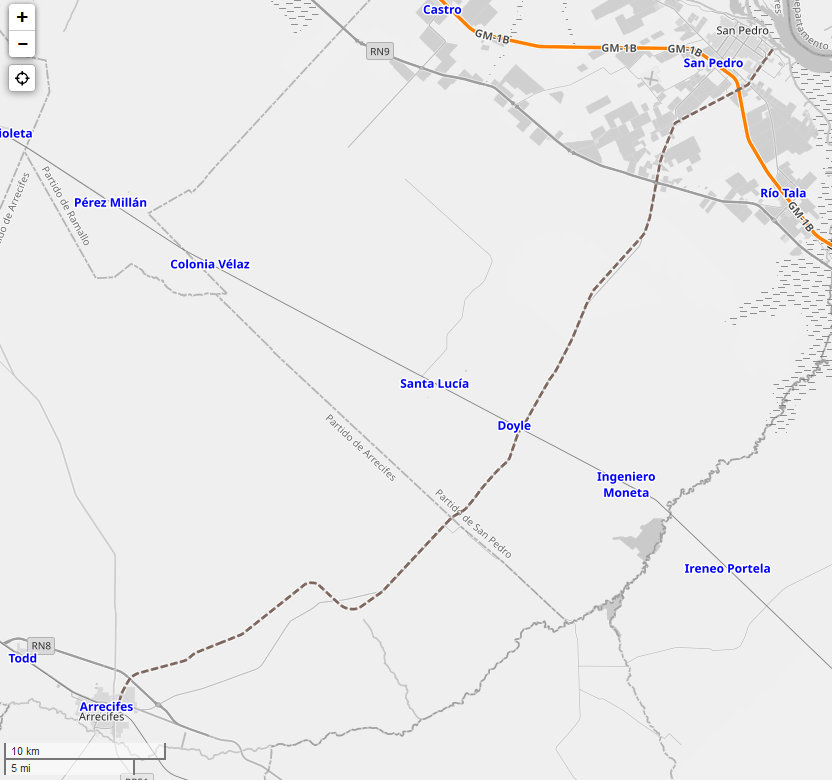

Depietri Railways and Elevators (Ferrocarriles y Elevadores Depietri in Spanish) was a railway company that built an economic 1,000 mm (3 ft 3 3/8 in) line between the cities of San Pedro and Arrecifes in Buenos Aires Province. The company, established by Eduardo Depietri, also built the port of San Pedro. The railway (whose main activity was the transport of grains) run from 1936 until 1948, when the entire Argentine network was nationalised and the FCED expropriated by the government.

== History ==
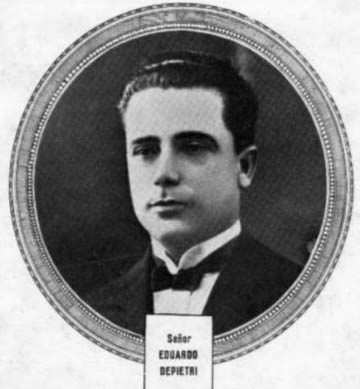
Eduardo Depietri, founder

Uruguayan engineer and entrepreneur Eduardo Depietri (1893–1970) had conceived a metre gauge railway line that run through the Buenos Aires Province from west to east, connecting with other lines such as Córdoba Central and Central Argentine. Depietri came up with a project that received approval from the Government of the Province.

The project was to build two economic railway networks, the first from Necochea to Olavarría (connecting with the Provincial Railway). The other one would connect the ports of San Pedro, San Nicolás and Obligado with Ramallo, Pergamino, Arrecifes, Salto and Ingeniero De Madrid. That network would also connect with Compañía General de BA and Midland railway lines. In case of being carried out, the project included access to all the ports of the province –with the exception of Bahía Blanca– and the construction of Grain elevators in each one of them.

From 1925 the company got permissions from the provincial government to build the lines but the British-origin companies (led by the Buenos Aires Great Southern Railway) refused to the project alleging that the Depietri railway would compete with their own lines. The line Necochea–La Dulce began to be built in 1929 but the BAGSR objected to the construction and works were interrupted. When Depietri realised that the government had also bowed to pressure from the British company, he decided to focus on the north rail line that began in the port of San Pedro and works began there. Depietri built not only the railway line but a port in San Pedro that was inaugurated in 1933. Immediately after the port was concluded, Depietri began to build the grain elevator.

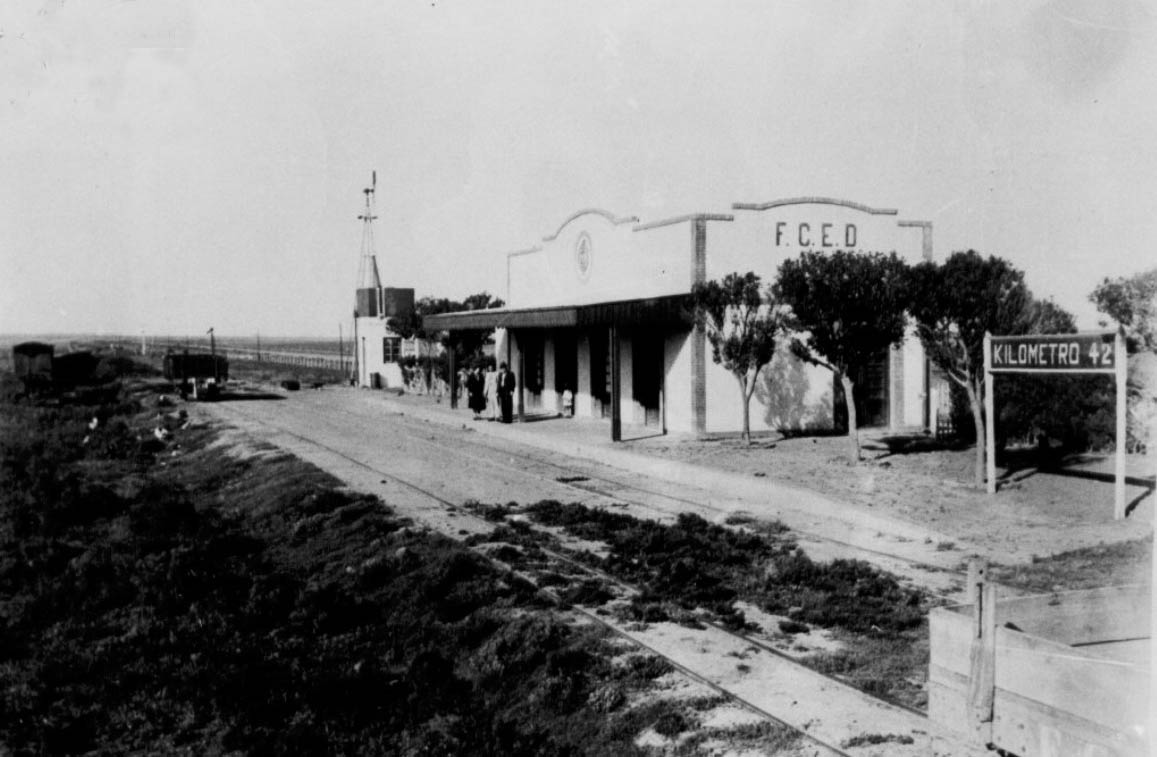
Kilómetro 42 station, c. 1937–48

Therefore, the railway line began to be built in San Pedro in 1932, including the grain elevator near the terminus. The line to Arrecifes was completed in 1934 but the Central Argentine Railway refused to Depietri's railway crossed its tracks although a viaduct had been built near CAR's San Pedro station. One year later both companies reached an agreement so the trains could run as planned. In 1935 the Depietri railway reached km. 30 station where it connected with the CCR's at km. 158, starting its activities in 1936.

The FCED's rolling stock were second-hand locomotives and wagons acquired to other companies. The stock included 7 locomotives (from Midland); 5 passenger coaches, 111 freight wagons and one crane (from CAR). From 1936 the line carried cereals and other cargo between San Pedro and Arrecifes (covering a total distance of 68 km).

With the railway Nationalisation in Argentina of 1948, the FCED remained as the only private railway company but soon after the government expropriated the FCED's grain elevators of San Pedro, which caused material injury to Depietri considering that no compensation was paid. On November 14, 1949, a decree stated the concession was revoked alleging breach of contract from the concessionary.

Trains would never run again because the Provincial Railway was not interested in the line, which was located 200 km distant from its own network. Recently created General Belgrano Railway (which had taken over the Central Norte railway, among other 1000 mm gauge railways) was not interested either. From then on, the tracks, rolling stock and signals were abandoned and deteriorated as time went by. The company was dissolved in late 1960s and Depietri died in 1970. Some years later, the tracks were lifted and the lands and installations were sold to confectionery company Arcor.
