= Cicaré =

Argentine helicopter manufacturer

Cicaré S.A.
- Company type: Sociedad Anónima
- Industry: Aerospace
- Founded: 1972
- Headquarters: Argentina
- Key people: Augusto Cicaré
- Products: Helicopters, aircraft components
- Website: cicare.com.ar/en/

Cicaré S.A. (originally Cicaré Aeronáutica S.A. and later Cicaré Helicópteros S.A.) is an Argentine helicopter manufacturer founded by Augusto Cicaré in Saladillo, Buenos Aires Province in the 1970s to develop aircraft of his own design. A number of prototypes were constructed, including one under contract from the Argentine Air Force, but no great successes were achieved until the CH-7 light sporting helicopter in the 1990s.

In March 2007, the first prototype of a Cicaré CH-14, a light helicopter for the Argentine Army, was ready. On March 18, 2010, they presented the CH-7B and CH-12 during the EAA Argentina Annual Meeting.

The company exports to Europe, Australia, the Middle East, Taiwan, China and Alaska.

== Products ==
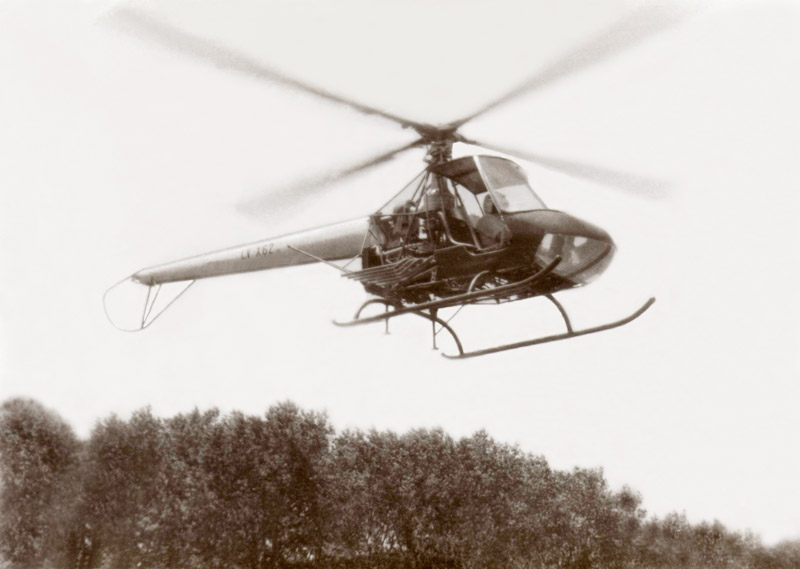
Cicare CK.1/CH-3 Colibri

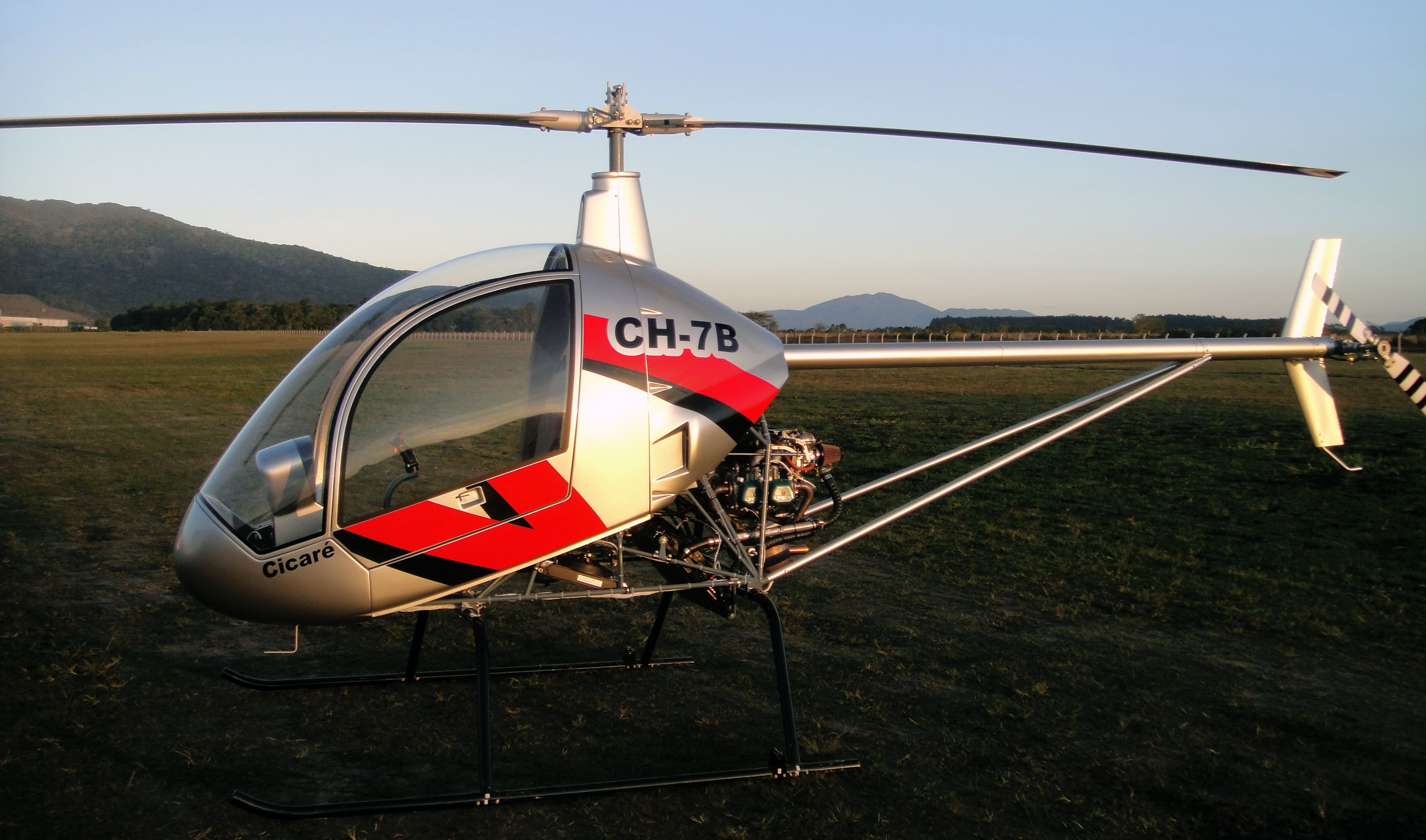
Cicaré CH-7B

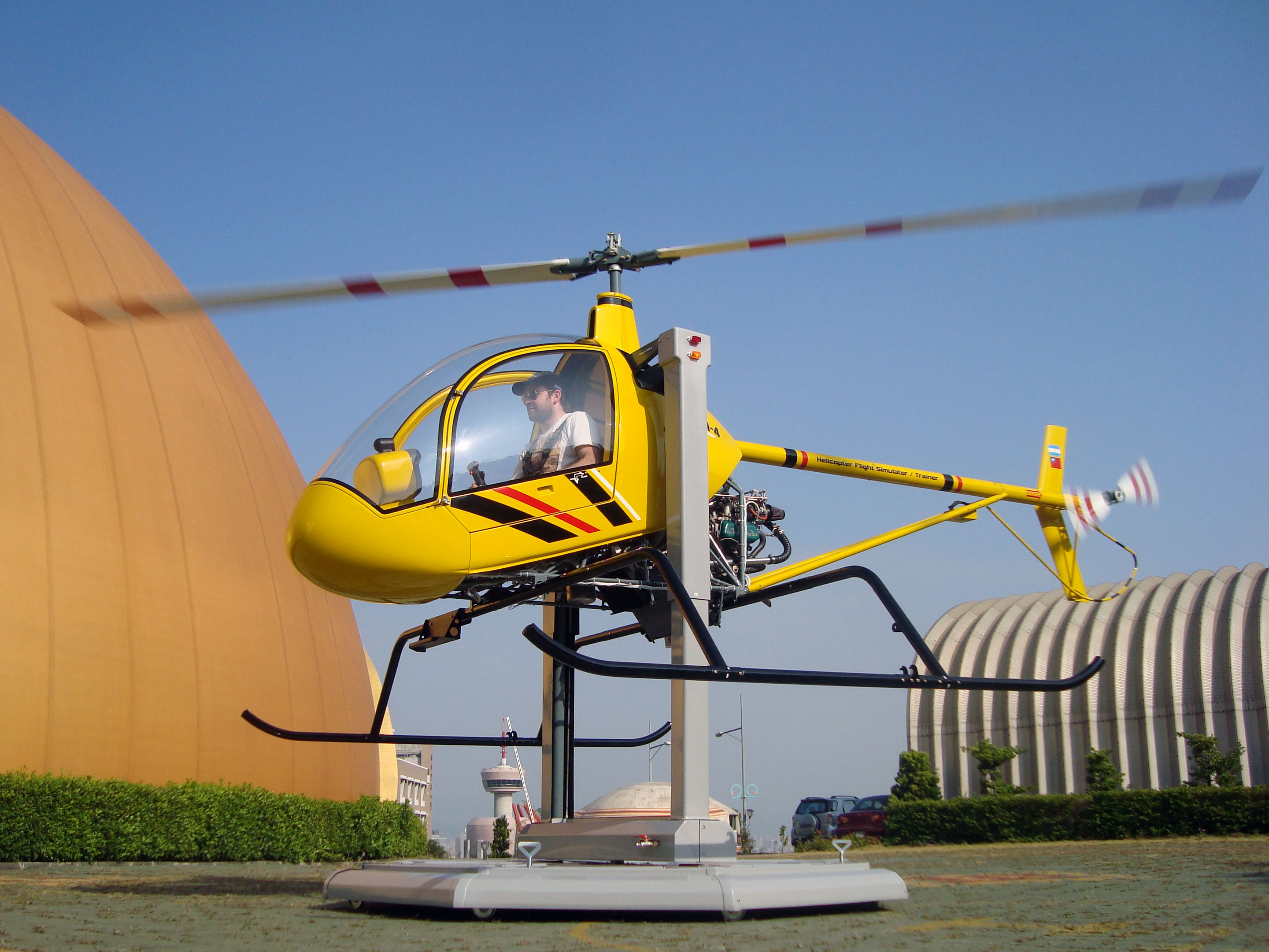
Cicaré Trainer.

=== Former aircraft ===
- CH-1 (1961)
- CH-2 (1964)
- CH-3 Colibri (1976)
- CH-4 (1982)
- CH-5 AG (1986)
- CH-6 (1987) – rights acquired by the Italian company HeliSport in 1989, which produced a new design, CH-7, based upon the CH-6.
- CH-6T (1999)
- CH-8 UL (1993)
- CH-9 (1995)
- CH-11 – Coaxial helicopter
- CH-14 – (2007) One prototype built. Defense, turbine engine

=== Helicopter trainer ===
- Cicaré SVH-4 – It is a conventional helicopter design attached to a mobile ground platform, which allows the use of all flight controls including lift off to a normal hover at 3 ft AGL and hover taxiing. The platform has eight free rotating wheels which allow moves in all directions; and an air tank that has pneumatic cylinders which allow the helicopter to rise and descend adjusting the level of difficulty during learning.

=== Present aircraft ===
Model	Configuration	Engine	Power [HP]
Cicaré SVH-4	Helicopter Flight Trainer	Rotax 912	100
Cicaré 7B	Single seat	Rotax 912 ULS	100
Cicaré 7T	Two tandem seat	Rotax 914UL	115
Cicaré 8	Two seat side by side ULM	Epapower 917Ti / Rotax 915	135 / 150
Cicaré 12	Two seat side by side	Lycoming HIO-360	180

=== Engines ===
- Cicaré 4C2T (1973)

== See also ==
- AeroDreams
- RACA S.A.

== Source ==
- Gunston, Bill (1993). World Encyclopedia of Aircraft Manufacturers. Annapolis: Naval Institute Press. p. 78.
