= Cicaré CH-14 Aguilucho =

Aircraft model

CH-14 Aguilucho
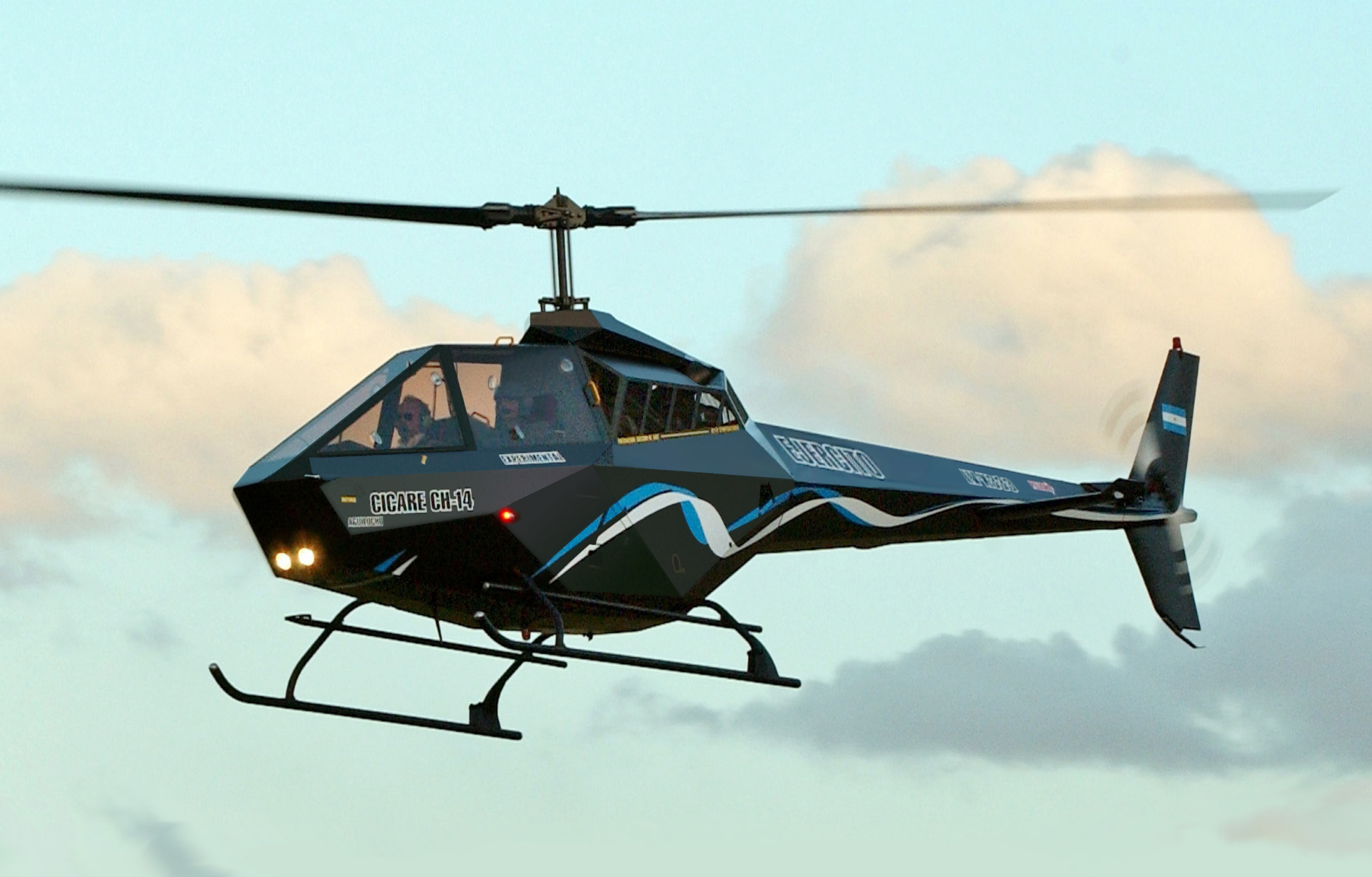

General information
- Type: Observation helicopter
- Manufacturer: Cicare Helicopteros S.A.
- Designer: Augusto Cicare
- Status: In development
- Primary user: Argentine Army
- Number built: 1

History
- First flight: 19 March 2007

The Cicare CH-14 Aguilucho (Spanish for "Little Eagle" or "Harrier") is a light experimental helicopter manufactured by Cicaré Helicópteros of Argentina. The helicopter is intended for use in civil, security and military roles.

== Design and development ==
In 2005, the Argentine Army Aviation commissioned Augusto Cicaré to build a light helicopter. The prototype was completed early in 2007, and the first flight occurred on 19 March 2007. The prototype made its public debut during "Army Aviation Day" on 23 November 2007.

== Specifications (CH-14) ==
Data from Cicare CH-14 Aguilucho technical data,

General characteristics

- Crew: 2
- Capacity: 700 kg (1,543 lb) payload
- Length: 9.8 m (32 ft 2 in) fuselage
- Length rotors running: 11.8 m (39 ft)
- Height: 3.3 m (10 ft 10 in)
- Empty weight: 750 kg (1,653 lb)
- Max takeoff weight: 1,450 kg (3,197 lb)
- Powerplant: 1 × Rolls-Royce Model 250-C20B turboshaft engine, 313 kW (420 hp) for take-off

261 kW (350 hp) maximum continuous

- Main rotor diameter: 10 m (32 ft 10 in)
- Main rotor area: 78.54 m^{2} (845.4 sq ft) running at 380 rpm

Performance

- Cruise speed: 210 km/h (130 mph, 110 kn)
- Never exceed speed: 240 km/h (150 mph, 130 kn)
- Range: 630 km (390 mi, 340 nmi)
- Ferry range: 1,000 km (620 mi, 540 nmi)
- Endurance: 3 hours
- Service ceiling: 4,500 m (14,800 ft)
- Rate of climb: 8 m/s (1,600 ft/min)
- Disk loading: 18.46 kg/m^{2} (3.78 lb/sq ft)

== See also ==
Aircraft of comparable role, configuration, and era

- Atlas XH-1 Alpha
- Bell 207 Sioux Scout
- IAR 317 Airfox
- HESA Shahed 285

Related lists

- List of rotorcraft
