= Heli-Sport =

Italian aircraft manufacturer

Coordinates: 45.0757738°N 7.7404360°E

Heli-Sport srl
- Type: Privately held company
- Industry: Aerospace
- Founded: 1989
- Headquarters: Turin, Italy
- Key people: Barbero brothers
- Products: Kit helicopters
- Website: ch-7helicopter.com

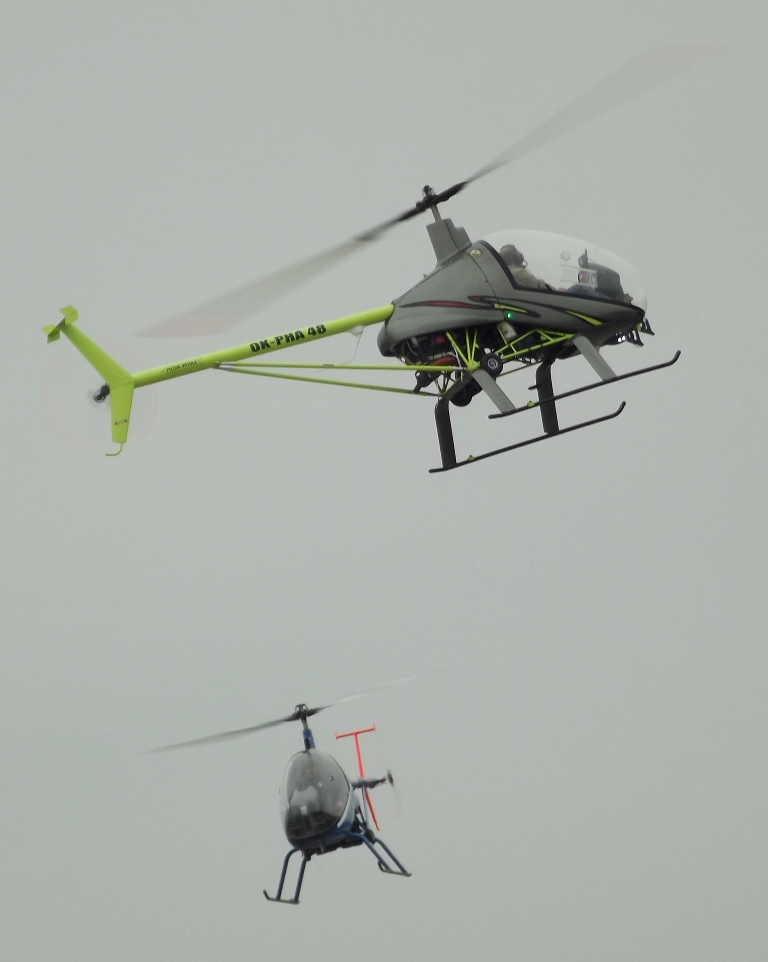
Heli-Sport CH-7 Kompress demonstration

Heli-Sport srl (also called CH-7 Heli-Sport srl) is an Italian aircraft manufacturer based in Turin, founded by the Barbero brothers, Igi, Josy and Charlie. The company specializes in the design and manufacture of helicopters in the form of kits for amateur construction.

The company was founded in 1989 as EliSport and renamed Heli-Sport in 1997. It is a Società a responsabilità limitata (Srl), an Italian limited liability company.

The company produces a line of helicopters, all based upon the Argentine Cicare CH-6 designed by Augusto Cicaré. It was developed by Josi and Claudio Barbero and sports car designer Marcello Gandini, who designed the new, enclosed cabin. The aircraft was introduced in 1992 as the Heli-Sport CH-7 Angel. This was developed into the tandem two-seat Heli-Sport CH-7 Kompress in 1997, the Heli-Sport CH-7 Kompress Charlie in 2005 and the CH-7 Kompress Charlie 2. The two seats in side-by-side configuration Heli-Sport CH77 Ranabot were a further development of the same basic design.

The CH-7 Kompress Charlie 2 won a bronze medal at the World Air Games in Turin in 2009. Another Charlie 2 was flown to EAA AirVenture Oshkosh in 2010, from France across the Atlantic Ocean.

== Aircraft ==
Summary of aircraft built by Heli-Sport
Model name	First flight	Number built	Type
Heli-Sport CH-7 Angel	1992	120	single-seat helicopter
Heli-Sport CH-7 Kompress	1997	250	tandem two-seat helicopter
Heli-Sport CH-7 Kompress Charlie	2005	250	tandem two-seat helicopter
Heli-Sport CH-7 Kompress Charlie 2			tandem two-seat helicopter
Heli-Sport CH77 Ranabot			side-by-side configuration two-seat helicopter
