= Millennium MH-1 =

American helicopter

MH-1

General information
- Type: Helicopter
- National origin: United States
- Manufacturer: Millennium Helicopter
- Status: In production (2011)

History
- Developed from: Revolution Mini-500

The Millennium MH-1 is an American helicopter based on the now out of production Revolution Mini-500 and produced by Millennium Helicopter. The aircraft is supplied as a series of kits for amateur modification of existing Mini 500s and as a new kit to build from scratch.

== Design and development ==
The MH-1 was originally provided as a series of kits to upgrade old Mini-500 airframes, allowing the owner to modify them to MH-1 standards. The kits include a new Yamaha engine of 130 hp (97 kW), that replaces the Mini-500's 64 hp (48 kW) Rotax 582, plus a new mount for the Yamaha engine. The remaining kits cover modifications to the main transmission, the tail, main drive and clutch basket, radiator fans and relay and the rotor head. The aircraft can also be built new from a complete kit. In either case the resulting MH-1 complies with the US experimental - amateur-built rules.

The MH-1 features a single main rotor with a two-bladed tail rotor, a single-seat enclosed cockpit with a windshield and skid-type landing gear. Its 19 ft (5.8 m) diameter two-bladed rotor has a chord of 8 in (20.3 cm). The aircraft has an empty weight of 600 lb (272 kg) and a gross weight of 1,100 lb (499 kg), giving a useful load of 500 lb (227 kg).

The Federal Aviation Administration approved the MH-1 conversion as a distinct aircraft type.

== Specifications (version) ==
Data from Bayerl

General characteristics

- Crew: one
- Empty weight: 600 lb (272 kg)
- Gross weight: 1,100 lb (499 kg)
- Powerplant: 1 × Yamaha liquid-cooled, four stroke engine, 130 hp (97 kW)
- Main rotor diameter: 19 ft (5.8 m)

Performance

- Maximum speed: 132 mph (213 km/h, 115 kn)
