= Juan Pablo Belatti =

Argentine football referee (born 1979)

- Born: 15 April 1979 (age 47); Saladillo, Buenos Aires Province, Argentina
- Other occupation: Physical education teacher

Domestic
Years	League	Role
2008–present	Argentine Primera División	Assistant referee

International
Years	League	Role
2011–present	FIFA listed	Assistant referee

Juan Pablo Belatti (born 15 April 1979) is an Argentine football assistant referee who is the most active assistant referee in FIFA World Cup editions, having taken part in Brazil 2014, Russia 2018, and Qatar 2022; he was also selected for the 2026 edition in North America.

Belatti was one of the assistant referees in the final of Russia 2018.

== Career ==
=== National ===
Belatti was born in Saladillo, Buenos Aires, in April 1979, the son of a Luis Belatti and his wife Cristina, Belatti has an older brother and a younger sister. The family moved from Saladillo to La Plata when Belatti was less than two years old, growing up in the neighborhood of Tolosa. He began his football career as a player, initially as a right-back and later as a left-back, a position he held until a serious fracture in his right leg forced him to retire. In 2001, Belatti began his refereeing course, which was certified by the Argentine Football Association in 2003. Belatti made his debut in the Primera División in 2008 at the Estadio Diego Armando Maradona in a match between Argentinos Juniors and Newell's Old Boys. He has also refereed in Superclásico matches between Boca Juniors and River Plate.

=== International ===
Belatti became international in 2011, when he made his debut in the Copa Libertadores in a match between CA Independiente and Godoy Cruz. His most prominent performances include the 2013 FIFA Confederations Cup in Brazil, the 2017 FIFA Confederations Cup in Russia, as well as two editions of Copa América: Chile 2015 and Brazil 2019. Outside CONMEBOL, Belatti took part in the UEFA Euro 2020, accompanying referee Fernando Rapallini, and in the men's tournament of the 2016 Summer Olympics in Rio de Janeiro.

==== FIFA World Cups ====
Belatti has a record-breaking participation in the FIFA World Cup, beginning in Brazil 2014 alongside referee Néstor Pitana, with whom he worked again in Russia 2018. In Russia's World Cup, Belatti was assigned as an assistant referee to several matches, including the opening match between Russia and Saudi Arabia, a group match between Mexico and Sweden, as well as a round of 16 game between Denmark and Croatia, a quarterfinal between Uruguay and France, and the final between France and Croatia in Moscow.

He took part in Qatar 2022, and his most advanced game was a round of 16 match between Spain and Morocco. In April 2026, Belatti earned his fourth designation for a FIFA World Cup, being chosen as part of the assistant referees of referee Facundo Tello. Aside from his own record, Belatti is part of a record-breaking group of Argentine officials at the World Cup, which includes two other referees, Darío Herrera and Yael Falcón, as well as Hernán Mastrangelo as a video assistant referee.

== Personal life ==
Belatti resides in La Plata and is married to his wife Adriana, with whom he has three children: Francisco, Lucrecia, and Atilio. He is a physical education teacher.

He has taken part in campaigns against gender violence against women, working with a politician from Córdoba Province that he met in December 2008 during a football trip. A referee who worked with Belatti, Patricio Loustau, said that Belatti did not take off a white bracelet that this woman gave to him, wearing it for two years.
