= Cicaré 4C2T =

Argentine piston engine

- Type: Air-cooled four-cylinder horizontally opposed two-stroke piston engine
- National origin: Argentina
- Manufacturer: Cicaré Aeronáutica
- First run: 1973

The Cicaré 4CT2 is an Argentine air-cooled, four-cylinder, horizontally opposed, two-stroke, piston engine designed and built by Cicaré Aeronáutica as a light, low cost engine.

== Application ==
- Cicaré Helicopter # 1
- Cicaré CK.1

== Specifications ==
Data from Jane's All the World's Aircraft 1994-95

=== General characteristics ===
- Type: Air-cooled four-cylinder horizontally opposed two-stroke piston engine
- Bore: 74 mm (2.91 in)
- Stroke: 76 mm (3.00 in)
- Displacement: 1,307cc (79.8 in³)
- Length: 810 mm (31.89 in)
- Width: 660 mm (25.98 in)
- Height: 550 mm (21.65 in)
- Dry weight: 68 kg (150 lb)

=== Components ===
- Valvetrain: 1 inlet and 1 exhaust valve per cylinder
- Fuel system: Updraught flow-type carburettor
- Fuel type: Mixture of 40 parts 80-octane to 1 part SAE40 oil
- Cooling system: Air-cooled

=== Performance ===
- Power output: 69 hp (67 kW) at 4,500 rpm
- Compression ratio: 7.2:1

== See also ==
- I.Ae. 16 El Gaucho

Related lists

- List of aircraft engines
