= Heli-Sport CH77 Ranabot =

Italian helicopter

CH77 Ranabot
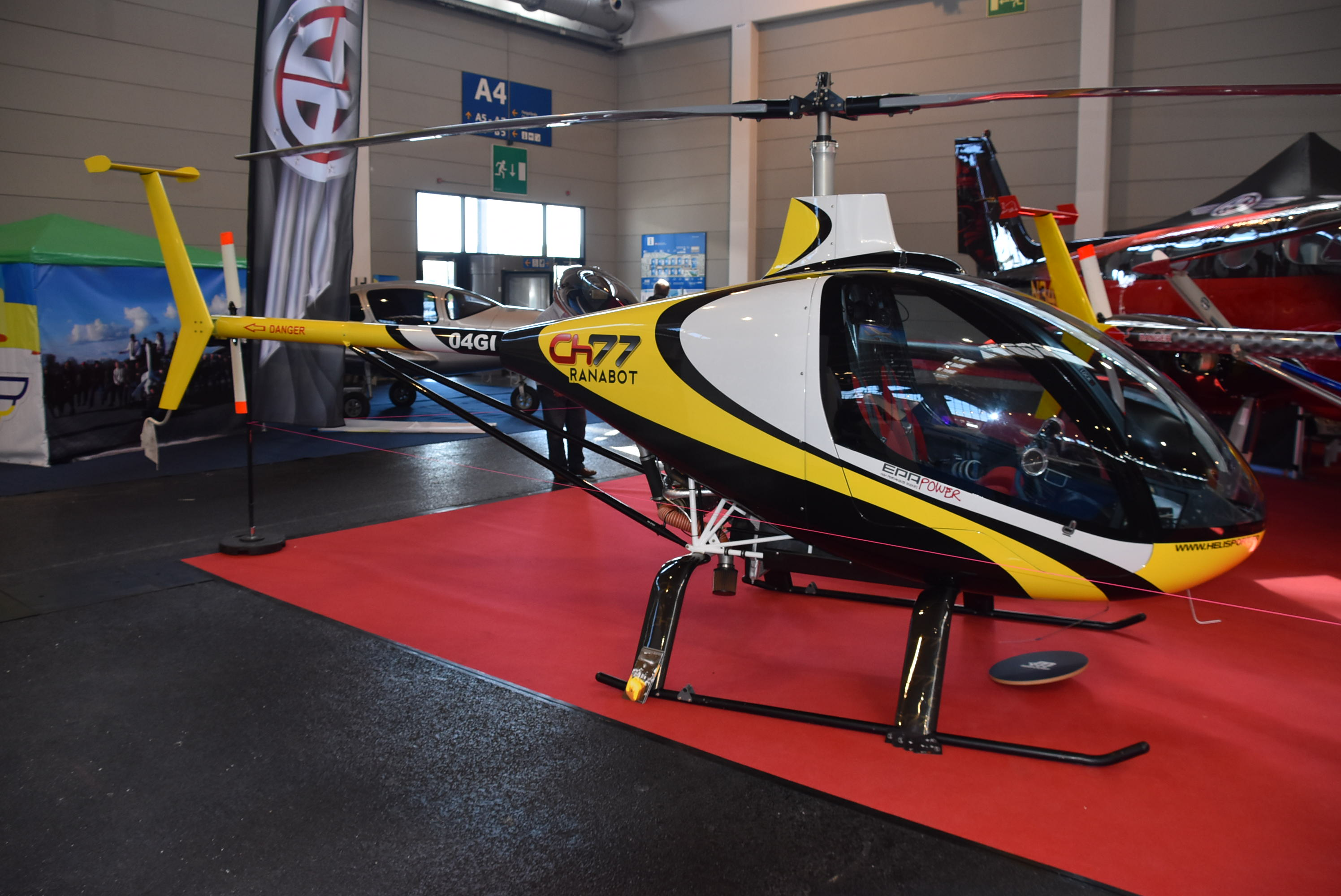

General information
- Type: Helicopter
- National origin: Italy
- Manufacturer: Heli-Sport
- Status: In production (2017)

The Heli-Sport CH77 Ranabot is an Italian helicopter designed and produced by Heli-Sport of Turin. The aircraft is supplied as a kit for amateur construction.

== Design and development ==
The CH77 Ranabot was designed to comply with the European Class 6 microlight helicopter rules. It features a single main rotor and tail rotor, a single-seat, a two-seats-in side-by-side configuration enclosed cockpit, skid landing gear and an EPA Power-modified four-cylinder, liquid and air-cooled, four stroke 130 hp (97 kW) Rotax 914 engine.

The aircraft's two-bladed rotor has a diameter of 6.28 m (20.6 ft). The aircraft has a typical empty weight of 280 kg (617 lb) and a gross weight of 500 kg (1,102 lb), giving a useful load of 220 kg (485 lb). With full fuel of 66 litres (15 imp gal; 17 US gal) the payload for the pilot, passenger and baggage is 173 kg (381 lb). The microlight category version has a gross weight of 450 kg (992 lb)

Reviewer Werner Pfaendler wrote, "with side-by-side seating combined with excellent comfort, handling and performance, plus a reliable engine (a Rotax 914 tuned by EPA Power), it has a lot to offer...[It] boasts minimal operating costs, only some 6% higher than the CH7 Kompress Charlie 2".

== Specifications (CH77 Ranabot) ==
Data from Tacke and manufacturer

General characteristics

- Crew: one
- Capacity: one passenger
- Length: 7.240 m (23 ft 9 in)
- Height: 2.470 m (8 ft 1 in)
- Empty weight: 280 kg (617 lb)
- Gross weight: 500 kg (1,102 lb)
- Fuel capacity: 66 litres (15 imp gal; 17 US gal) (one 33.5 litres (7.4 imp gal; 8.8 US gal) tank and one 32.5 litres (7.1 imp gal; 8.6 US gal) aux tank)
- Powerplant: 1 × Rotax 914 four cylinder, liquid and air-cooled, four stroke aircraft engine, tuned and balanced by EPA Power, 97 kW (130 hp)
- Main rotor diameter: 6.28 m (20 ft 7 in)
- Main rotor area: 31 m^{2} (330 sq ft)

Performance

- Maximum speed: 209 km/h (130 mph, 113 kn)
- Cruise speed: 160 km/h (99 mph, 86 kn)
- Never exceed speed: 209 km/h (130 mph, 113 kn)
- Range: 480 km (300 mi, 260 nmi)
- Endurance: 3 hours
- Service ceiling: 4,800 m (15,700 ft)
- Rate of climb: 7 m/s (1,400 ft/min)
- Disk loading: 16 kg/m^{2} (3.3 lb/sq ft)

== See also ==
- List of rotorcraft
