= Revolution Helicopter Corporation =

American helicopter manufacturer

Revolution Helicopter Company, Inc.
- Industry: Aerospace
- Founded: circa 1992
- Founder: Dennis L. Fetters
- Defunct: November 1999
- Headquarters: Excelsior Springs, Missouri, United States
- Key people: Dennis L. Fetters, President and CEO
- Products: Mini-500 kit helicopter

Revolution Helicopter Corp., Inc. (RHCI) was a kit helicopter manufacturer based in Excelsior Springs, Missouri.

The company designed, manufactured and marketed the Mini-500 single-seat helicopter, so-called because the fuselage superficially resembled the MD-500 five-place turbine powered helicopter.

== History ==
The company was founded by Dennis L. Fetters, a former associate of Augusto Cicaré, the self-taught Argentine inventor of a novel helicopter control linkage system. The design basis of the Mini-500 was Cicaré's CH-4, circa 1982. Before launching RHCI, Fetters had operated Air Command International, a manufacturer of autogyros.

The Mini-500 design initially intended to use Cicaré's control system design, but Fetters and Cicaré were unable to agree on licensing terms. Fetters instead elected to design and patent a "newly improved control system", as he termed it.

RHCI sold the last Mini-500 in October 1999 and the company went out of business in November after the product developed a poor safety record with more than 40 accidents and nine fatalities. Critics said that the aircraft was "woefully underpowered and subject to excessive engine and rotor vibrations that lead to cracked frames and other component failures."

At the time of its demise the company had a two-place kit helicopter under development, the Voyager-500. Former employees reported that the prototype flew less than three hours and only ever hovered. None were ever delivered to customers.

== Aftermath ==
Fetters claimed that the company's problems were caused by vocal critics who caused orders to fall off. In particular Fetters blamed Jim Campbell, publisher of US Aviator magazine, Bill Phillips, president of the International Experimental Helicopter Association, former RHCI dealer Fred Stewart, and former employees Lee Sarouhan and Rick Stitt.

In assessing the company failure Bill Phillips, president of the International Experimental Helicopter Association said: "In my opinion, Dennis Fetters is one of the biggest cons that’s ever hit the kit industry".

Jim Campbell, publisher of US Aviator magazine said: "I find this really sad. Nobody wanted to see him succeed more than we did, but the problem here is that there have been hundreds of failures, dozens of accidents and nine fatalities among 100 flying helicopters".

RHCI President Dennis L. Fetters said of the closure: "We at RHCI do not blame ourselves for the need to close our business. On the contrary, we credit ourselves for not only surviving these ruthless attacks, but for beating the odds of even starting a helicopter manufacturing factory. We took it farther than anyone could have expected under the circumstances". Shortly after the company closed, Fetters sold his house in Excelsior Springs, changed his name to Mohammed Al Faris and was unable to be located by the media for further interviews.

In the early 2010s, Fetters moved to China and started a new company, Fetters Aerospace, to develop unmanned aerial vehicles for Chinese customers. Fetters made a public appearance in 2013 in Washington, D.C. as Hubei Ewatt Technology Company's CTO at the 2013 Association for Unmanned Vehicle Systems International conference.
