= Heli-Sport CH-7 =

Argentine-Italian helicopter

CH-7/CH7
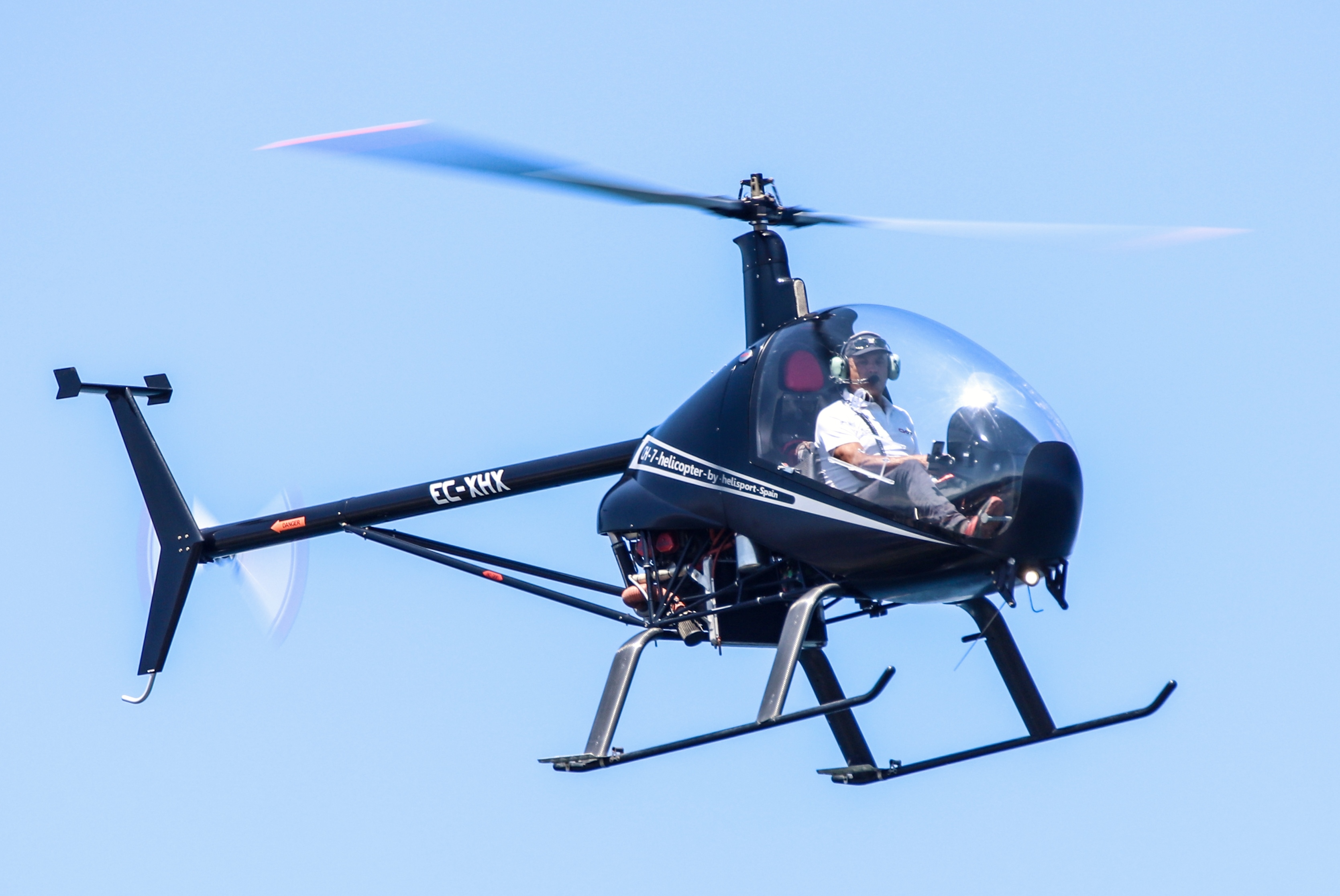
- CH-7 Kompress Charlie

General information
- Type: Ultralight kitbuilt helicopter
- National origin: Argentina/Italy
- Manufacturer: Cicaré; Heli-Sport
- Number built: c. 335 by May 2009

History
- Developed from: Cicaré CH-6

The Cicaré CH-7 and Heli-Sport CH7 are a series of ultralight, kit-built helicopters based on a single-seat Argentine design from the late 1980s. It was later developed into a tandem two-seater, and remains in production.

== Design and development ==
In 1989 EliSport, which became Heli-Sport in 1997, bought the rights to the Cicare CH-6, a small single-seat open cockpit helicopter designed in Argentina by Augusto Cicaré. It was developed by Josi and Claudio Barbero and, with the help of the sports car designer, Marcello Gandini who produced a new, enclosed cabin, marketed from 1992 as the CH-7 Angel. Its commercial success led to a tandem two-seat version with a stretched cabin and bigger engine, named the CH-7 Kompress and, in 2005, a further refinement designated the CH-7 Kompress Charlie.

The piston engine-powered CH-7 ultralight series use the traditional "penny-farthing" layout with two-bladed main and tail rotors. The main rotor is formed from composites and is a teetering, semi-rigid design with 6° of twist. The tail rotor is aluminium. The pod-and-boom fuselage has a fiberglass cabin built on a steel tube frame, with a long transparent forward-opening canopy. The steel frame also carries the engine, semi-exposed behind the accommodation and connected to the main rotor shaft by a belt drive. A slender aluminium boom, strengthened by a pair of long struts to the lower fuselage frame, carries both the tail rotor and swept fins. The upper fin is topped with a short horizontal tailplane, with small endplate fins, and the lower one ends with a tailskid. The CH-7 uses a simple aluminium skid undercarriage, which may be fitted with small wheels for ground handling or multi-tube inflatable floats for flying off water. In this last form the CH-7 is called the Mariner. The Kompress Charlie has faired, wide-chord carbon fibre skid legs.

The Kompress and Kompress Charlie are sold in kit form for home assembly, the manufacturers quoting a 200-hour building time. A fast-build kit, with more components pre-assembled, is claimed to require 85 hours.

The Kompress series may be fitted with a hook for lifting loads of up to 100 kg (220 lb), or fitted with spray bars for agricultural work.

== Operational history ==
120 Angels were built between 1992 and 1997, followed by 215 Kompress and Kompress Charlies up to May 2009. By mid-2009 the Kompress variants had logged over 30,000 flying hours with owners in 15 countries. There are dealerships in the Czech Republic, France, Italy and Poland.

In 2007 the CH-7 won the Italian Helicopter Championships. It gained 3rd place in the 2009 World Air Games.

== Variants ==
Information from Jane's All the World's Aircraft 2010 and manufacturer's website

CH-7 Angel
CH-6 with new, enclosed cockpit, powered by either 48 kW (64 hp) Rotax 582UL UL or 60 kW (80 hp) Rotax 912 UL. First marketed in 1992, but kits no longer (2010) available.

CH-7 Kompress
Tandem two-seat version, with elongated cockpit and 114 hp (85 kW) Rotax 914 engine. Still available, upgradable to Kompress Charlie standard.

CH-7 Kompress Charlie
2005 development of Kompress with greater fuel capacity, hinged carbon fibre engine cowlings and carbon fibre, airfoil section undercarriage legs. Vibration reduced and speed and high altitude performance improved.

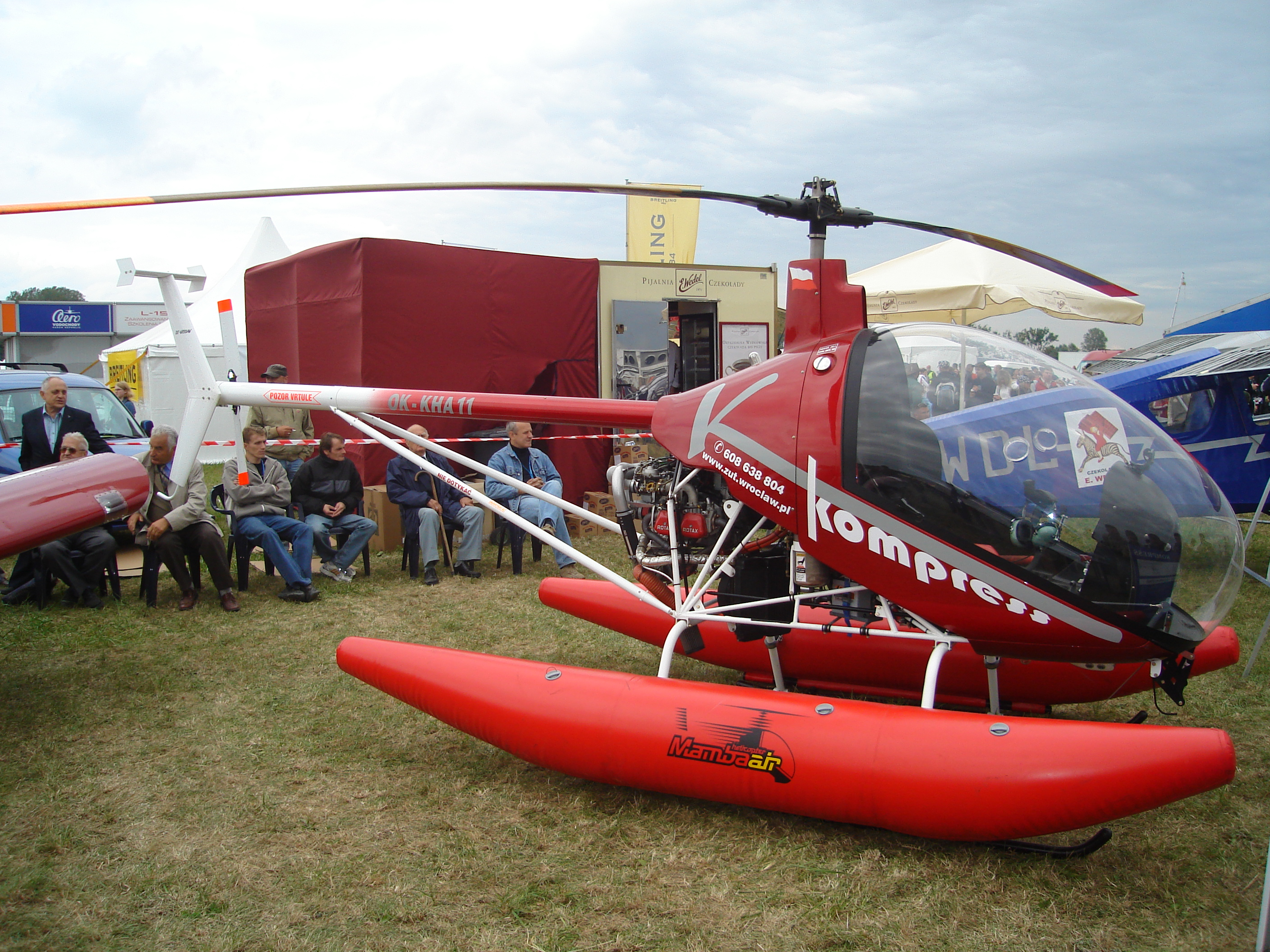
CH-7 Mariner at the Radom Air Show, 2007

CH-7 Mariner
Inflatable float-equipped version, 15 kg (33 lb) heavier.

CH-7B Spirit
Evolutionary design version, powered by a four cylinder, air and liquid-cooled, four-stroke, dual-ignition 100 hp (75 kW) Rotax 912S engine. In production 2011 by Cicaré SA of Argentina.

CH-7T Spirit Tandem
Version, powered by a four cylinder, air and liquid-cooled, four-stroke, dual-ignition 115 hp (86 kW) Rotax 914 engine. In production as a 51% kit and as a ready-to-fly aircraft in 2015 by Cicaré SA of Argentina.

== Specifications (Kompress Charlie, European specification) ==
Data from Jane's All the World Aircraft 2010/11

General characteristics

- Crew: one
- Capacity: one passenger
- Length: 7.05 m (23 ft 2 in) overall, rotors turning; fuselage length 5.31 m (17 ft 5 in)
- Height: 2.35 m (7 ft 9 in)
- Empty weight: 275 kg (606 lb)
- Max takeoff weight: 450 kg (992 lb)
- Fuel capacity: 60 L (15.8 US gal, 13.2 Imp gal) usable standard, further 19 L (5.0 US gal, 4.2 Imp gal) in optional auxiliary tank.
- Powerplant: 1 × Rotax 914 , 84.6 kW (113.5 hp)
- Main rotor diameter: 6.20 m (20 ft 4 in)

Performance

- Cruise speed: 160 km/h (99 mph, 86 kn)
- Never exceed speed: 192 km/h (119 mph, 104 kn)
- Range: 480 km (300 mi, 260 nmi) with standard fuel load
- Endurance: 3 hr
- Service ceiling: 5,000 m (16,000 ft) service; hover ceiling out of ground effect is 2,500 m (8,200 ft)

== See also ==
- Mosquito Aviation XE
- Homebuilt aircraft

Related lists

- List of single seat helicopters
