= Arrecifes Partido =

Arrecifes Partido de Arrecifes
- Department
- Location of Arrecifes in Gran Buenos Aires
- Country: Argentina
- Province: Buenos Aires
- Established: 1901
- Seat: Arrecifes

Government
  - Intendant: Fernando Bouvier, PRO

Area
  - Total: 1,183 km^{2} (457 sq mi)

Population
  - Total: 27,279
  - Density: 23.06/km^{2} (59.72/sq mi)
- Demonym: arrecifense
- Postal Code: B2740
- IFAM: BUE011
- Area Code: 02478
- Website: http://www.muniarrecifes.gov.ar/

Arrecifes Partido is a partido in the north-east of Buenos Aires Province in Argentina. It is at coordinates 34°04′S 60°07′W.

The provincial subdivision has a population of 27,279 inhabitants in an area of 1,183 km^{2} (457 sq mi), and its capital city is Arrecifes, which is around 170 km (110 mi) from Buenos Aires.

The district was founded in 1901, and the people are known as arrecifeños.

== Sports ==
Arrecifes is home to Club Atlético Almirante Brown football club.

== Towns ==
- Arrecifes
- Todd
- Viña
