= Saladillo Partido =

Saladillo Partido de Saladillo
- Department
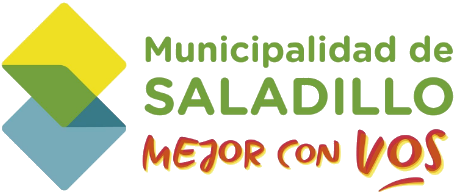

- location of Saladillo Partido in Buenos Aires Province
- Coordinates: 35°38′S 57°46′W
- Country: Argentina
- Established: December 25, 1839
- Founder: Juan Manuel de Rosas
- Seat: Saladillo

Government
  - Intendant: Jose Luis Salomon (UCR)

Area
  - Total: 2,736 km^{2} (1,056 sq mi)

Population
  - Total: 29,600
  - Density: 10.8/km^{2} (28.0/sq mi)
- Demonym: saladillense
- Postal Code: B7260
- IFAM: BUE108
- Area Code: 02344
- Patron saint: Nuestra Señora de la Asunción
- Website: saladillo.gob.ar

Saladillo Partido is a partido of Buenos Aires Province in Argentina.

The provincial subdivision has a population of about 30,000 inhabitants in an area of 2,736 km^{2} (1,056 sq mi), and its capital city is Saladillo, which is around 180 km (110 mi) from Buenos Aires.

== Settlements ==
- Álvarez de Toledo
- Del Carril
- Cazón
- Polvaredas
- Saladillo, cabecera (capital city)
- El Mangrullo
- La Barrancosa
- La Campana
- La Mascota
- La Razón
- La Margarita
- Juan José Blaquier
- Esther
- Emiliano Reynoso
- Saladillo Norte
- José R. Sojo
- San Blas
- Gobernador Ortíz de Rosas
- San Benito
