= Arrecifes =

Town in Buenos Aires Province, Argentina

- Location in Argentina
- Coordinates: 34°04′S 60°07′W
- Country: Argentina
- Province: Buenos Aires
- Partido: Arrecifes
- Founded: 20 September 1586

Population (2022 census [INDEC])
  - Total: 32,215
- CPA Base: B 2740
- Area code: +54 2478
- Climate: Cfa

Arrecifes is a town in Buenos Aires Province, Argentina. It is the administrative seat of Arrecifes Partido.

== History ==
- 20 September 1586 the first time which a Spanish conqueror mentioned in his notes: "Pago de los Arrecifes", this is the oldest notice of the early days of Arrecifes. The first population at the Arrecifes river banks appeared after 1600. At this time it was a forced path to cross the Arrecifes river in the route to Upper Peru and Chile.
- 1767: The "Cabildo" (In the Spanish colony, cabildos were in charge of the city administration and the justice) created the Arrecifes district, the second in the province.
- 1785: The first mayor is elected.
- 1 March 1856: The first city hall is built and the local government established.
- 1950: Officially declared a city in Arrecifes district.
- The name of the District changes a lot of time for "Bartolomé Mitre" a Governor of Buenos Aires province.
- 1994: Last change, since 1994 is Arrecifes District..
