= Saladillo, Buenos Aires =

Saladillo
- Location in Argentina Location in Buenos Aires Province
- Coordinates: 35°38′S 59°46′W
- Country: Argentina
- Province: Buenos Aires
- Partido: Saladillo
- Founded: July 31, 1863
- Elevation: 40 m (130 ft)

Population (2022 census [INDEC])
  - Total: 35,669
- CPA Base: B 7260
- Area code: +54 2344

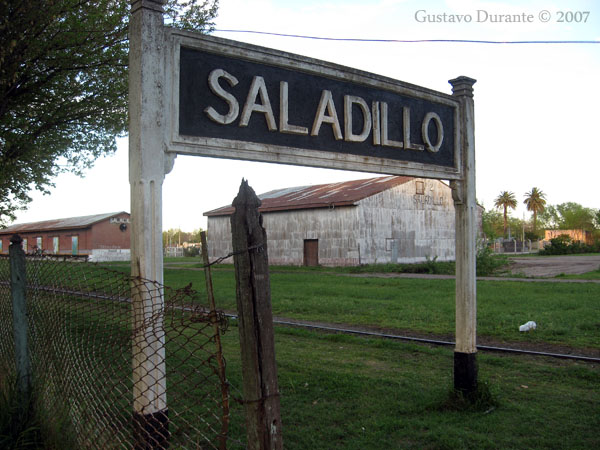
Saladillo railway station

Saladillo is a town in Buenos Aires Province, Argentina. It is the administrative centre for Saladillo Partido.

== Notable people ==
- Marcos Delia, professional basketball player
- Julio Olarticochea, Argentine former footballer
- Juan Pablo Belatti, FIFA assistant referee
- Tamara Elisabet DeMarco - professional boxer
