= Augusto Cicaré =

Argentine aviation designer and inventor (1937–2022)

Augusto Ulderico Cicaré
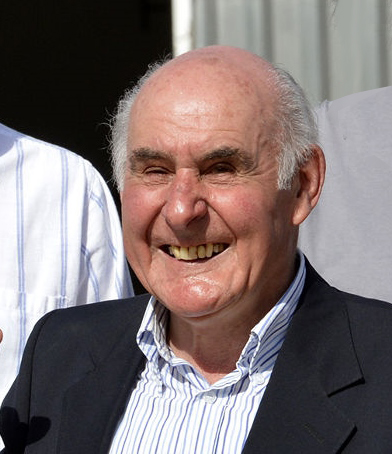
- Born: 25 May 1937; Polvaredas, Argentina
- Died: 26 January 2022 (aged 84); Saladillo, Buenos Aires, Argentina
- Known for: CH-7 Helicopter
- Awards: Juan Manuel Fangio Prize
- Scientific career
- Fields: Engineering, aviation design

Augusto Ulderico Cicaré (25 May 1937 – 26 January 2022) was an Argentine inventor, engineer, and aviation designer.

At the age of 11, still in 5th grade, he built his first four stroke engine that he used to drive a washing machine. In this same period he converted the engine of a car to use propane gas instead of petrol. By age 15 he was constructing motorcycle engines.

In 1958, despite having never seen an actual helicopter before, and knowing little of helicopter design, Cicaré's first successful helicopter design, the CH-1, flew for the first time, with its designer as the test pilot, teaching himself how to fly in the process. The CH-1 was the first helicopter to have been designed and built in South America. By 1972, Cicaré was developing his third helicopter.

In the late 1960s, Cicaré designed a V-4 engine for use in DKW automobiles, the engine being extensively tested by driver Juan Manuel Fangio. A version of the engine for use in motorsports competition was also developed, but the closure of DKW resulted in the termination of the project.

Cicaré continued to be active in aviation design, with some of his later work including the Cicaré CH-10 and CH-11 ultralight helicopters, and the development of the Cicaré SVH-3 flight simulator, which was declared Argentina's national invention of the year in 1998.

He died in Saladillo, Buenos Aires on 26 January 2022, at the age of 84.

== Awards ==
A 1987 design for a fuel injection pump for Diesel engines resulted in Cicaré being awarded the Juan Manuel Fangio Prize, the highest award for Argentine inventors.

In 1970, Cicaré was declared to be one of the ten most outstanding young men of Argentina, and in 1996 he was named as a Friend of the Argentine Air Force. Cicaré also received an honorary Air and Space Engineer degree in 1997 from the Professional Council of Air and Space Engineering.

In 1999, a roundabout in Saladillo, Argentina was named in Cicaré's honour.

== See also ==
- Cicaré Helicópteros
- Cicaré CK.1
- Cicaré CH-12
- Cicaré CH-16
- Heli-Sport CH-7
- Revolution Helicopter Corporation
