= Aeromot AMT-300 Turbo Ximango Shark =

Brazilian motor glider

AMT-300 Turbo Ximango Shark

General information
- Type: Motor glider
- National origin: Brazil
- Manufacturer: Aeromot
- Number built: 7

History
- Introduction date: 1999
- First flight: July 1997

The Aeromot AMT-300 Turbo Ximango Shark is a Brazilian motor glider manufactured by the aerospace company Aeromot.

== Design and development ==
It is a single piston engine, and one of the improved versions of the Aeromot Ximango family of motor gliders, also with composite structure and conventional retractable landing gear, also designed to carry one pilot and one passenger on short trips.

== Variants ==
AMT-300P Polícia
Version for military and police use for observation and reconnaissance.
AMT-300R Reboque
Gliger tug version

== Development ==
The AMT-300 Turbo Ximango was developed from the AMT-200 Super Ximango and was introduced around 1998. It was fitted with a turbocharged Rotax 914F engine of about 86 kW (115 hp), with a redesigned cockpit, new engine cowling and winglets, and was aimed at the basic flight-training market. A contemporary magazine description of the turbocharged Ximango noted its redesigned ailerons and winglets, and a cruising speed of 140 knots true airspeed. A reference directory describes it as the latest version of the Ximango family, powered by a 115 hp (85 kW) Rotax 914 F3.

== Military and police use ==
Flight International's military aircraft directory lists a reconnaissance version, the AMT 300 P Turbo Ximango Shark, powered by a Rotax 914 F3 of 85.75 kW. The directory says it was intended for high-altitude reconnaissance missions as well as ELINT and SIGINT operations.

== Specification ==
Data from Jackson 2007, p. 28

General characteristics

- Crew: 2
- Length: 8.08 m (26 ft 6 in)
- Wingspan: 17.67 m (58 ft 0 in)
- Height: 1.93 m (6 ft 4 in)
- Wing area: 18.75 m^{2} (201.8 sq ft)
- Empty weight: 630 kg (1,389 lb)
- Gross weight: 800 kg (1,764 lb)
- Max takeoff weight: 850 kg (1,874 lb)
- Powerplant: 1 × Rotax 914F turbo charged engine, 73.5 kW (98.6 hp)
- Propellers: 2-bladed MT-Propeller variable pitch, 1.65 m (5 ft 5 in) diameter

Performance

- Cruise speed: 225 km/h (140 mph, 121 kn)
- Stall speed: 78 km/h (48 mph, 42 kn)
- Never exceed speed: 245 km/h (152 mph, 132 kn)
- Range: 1,015 km (631 mi, 548 nmi)
- Ferry range: 1,500 km (930 mi, 810 nmi)
- Service ceiling: 8,700 m (28,500 ft)
- Maximum glide ratio: 32.1
- Rate of climb: 1.98 m/s (390 ft/min)
- Rate of sink: 0.96 m/s (189 ft/min)
- Wing loading: 45.3 kg/m^{2} (9.3 lb/sq ft)

== See also ==
Related development

- Fournier RF-10
- Aeromot AMT-200 Super Ximango

== Bibliography ==
- Jackson, Paul (2005). Jane's All The World's Aircraft 2005-2006. United Kingdom: Jane's Information Group. ISBN 9780710621566.
- Jackson, Paul (2007). Jane's All The World's Aircraft 2007-2008. United Kingdom: Jane's Information Group. ISBN 9780710627926.
