= OH-6 =

OH-6 may refer to:

- Hughes OH-6 Cayuse, a U.S. military helicopter
- Ohio's 6th congressional district
