= Aeromot AMT-600 Guri =

Two-seater light aircraft

AMT-600 Guri
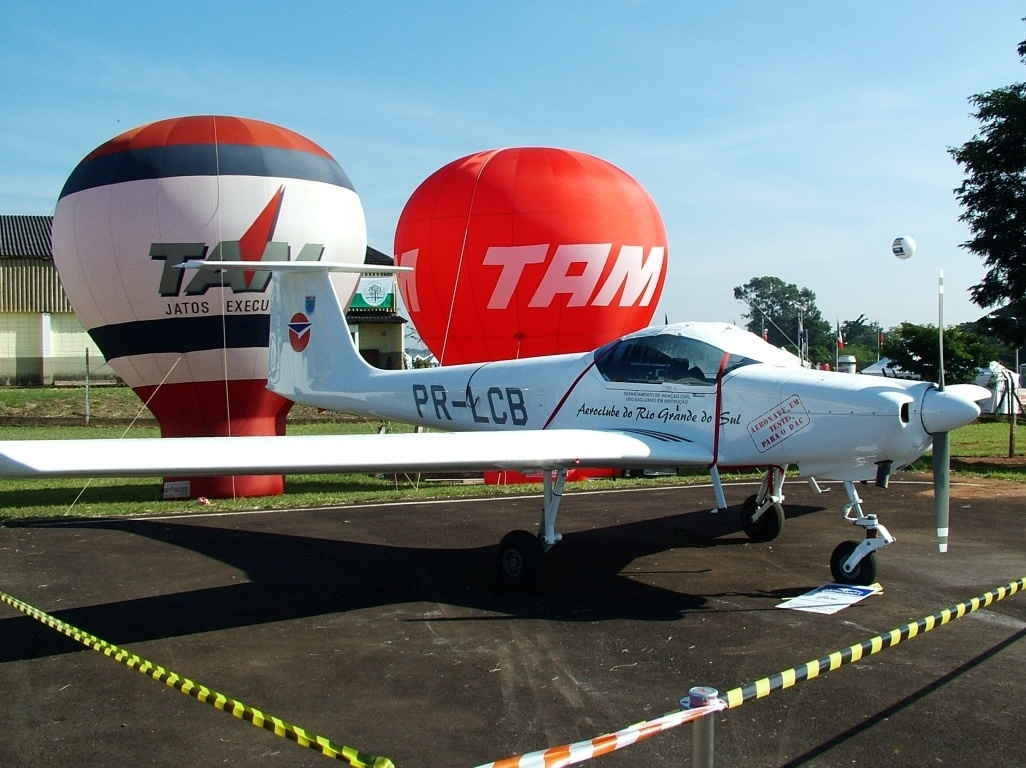
- An AMT-600 Guri in Expo Aero Brasil 2004

General information
- Type: Trainer aircraft
- Manufacturer: Aeromot
- Number built: 25

History
- Introduction date: 2003
- First flight: 13 July 1999

The Aeromot AMT-600 Guri is a two-seater light aircraft with a low cantilever wing and fixed tricycle landing gear from Brazil.

== Design and development ==
Derived from the Ximango glider series, this aircraft was ordered in series to replace the Aero Boero AB-115 as the basic training aircraft in Brazilian flying clubs and the first production aircraft left the factory on November 11, 2003.

On February 21, 2004 Aeromot and Guizhou Aircraft Industry Corporation signed an agreement to produce in China a retractable landing gear version of the Guri for the Asian market. This agreement provides for the creation of a subsidiary, Ximango China, and the supply of 20% of the aircraft by Aeromot.

== Specifications ==
Data from Jackson 2005, p. 29

General characteristics

- Crew: 2
- Length: 8.07 m (26 ft 6 in)
- Wingspan: 10.50 m (34 ft 5 in)
- Height: 2.65 m (8 ft 8 in)
- Wing area: 13.79 m^{2} (148.4 sq ft)
- Aspect ratio: 8.0
- Empty weight: 675 kg (1,488 lb)
- Max takeoff weight: 900 kg (1,984 lb)
- Fuel capacity: 88 L (23 US gal; 19 imp gal)
- Powerplant: 1 × Textron Lycoming O-235-NBR flat-four, 63.8 kW (85.6 hp)
- Propellers: 2-bladed Sensenich 72 CK-050, 1.83 m (6 ft 0 in) diameter aluminum propeller

Performance

- Cruise speed: 157 km/h (98 mph, 85 kn)
- Stall speed: 90 km/h (56 mph, 49 kn)
- Never exceed speed: 226 km/h (140 mph, 122 kn)
- Range: 1,450 km (900 mi, 780 nmi)
- Endurance: 6 hours
- Service ceiling: 5,300 m (17,400 ft)
- g limits: +3.8/-1.52
- Wing loading: 63.3 kg/m^{2} (13.0 lb/sq ft)

Avionics

- Garmin GPS 100
