= Vinh wiretap =

American espionage operation during the Vietnam War

- Part of the Vietnam War
- Type: Espionage mission
- Location: Vinh, North Vietnam
- Planned by: CIA
- Objective: Establish a wiretap, spy on North Vietnam
- Date: December 7, 1972 – early May 1973
- Executed by: Daniel H. Smith and Lloyd George Anthony Lamonte Jr., Lao commandos, CIA
- Outcome: Intelligence established until early May 1973

The Vinh wiretap was an American espionage operation of the Vietnam War. From 7 December 1972 through early May 1973, CIA telephone intercepts of North Vietnamese military communications were supplied to American diplomat Henry Kissinger. As border phone lines were well watched, the decision was made to tap a military multiplex line in the Vietnamese heartland near Vinh. The CIA used a black helicopter to set a clandestine wiretap to eavesdrop on Paris Peace Talks discussions and other intelligence.

== Background ==
During the Laotian Civil War portion of the Second Indochina War, Central Intelligence Agency spies in the Kingdom of Laos infiltrated the Ho Chi Minh Trail from the west to install wiretaps on Vietnamese communist telephone lines as early as 1966. The North Vietnamese clamped down on that effort with daily patrols checking for tampering along their phone lines on the Trail. By 1971, with Vietnamization winding down American resources in the Vietnam War, the American need for intelligence was greater than ever. The CIA's counter was to target a phone line deep within North Vietnam. Aerial photography disclosed a possible site for a tap 24 kilometers southwest of Vinh. A complex of military phone lines had been installed over a precipitous hill in a remote location; the communist patrols circled that hill without a close inspection of the lines on the summit. However, emplacing a tap at that location would entail crossing the heavily defended Trail and penetrating deep into North Vietnam.

== Planning and training ==
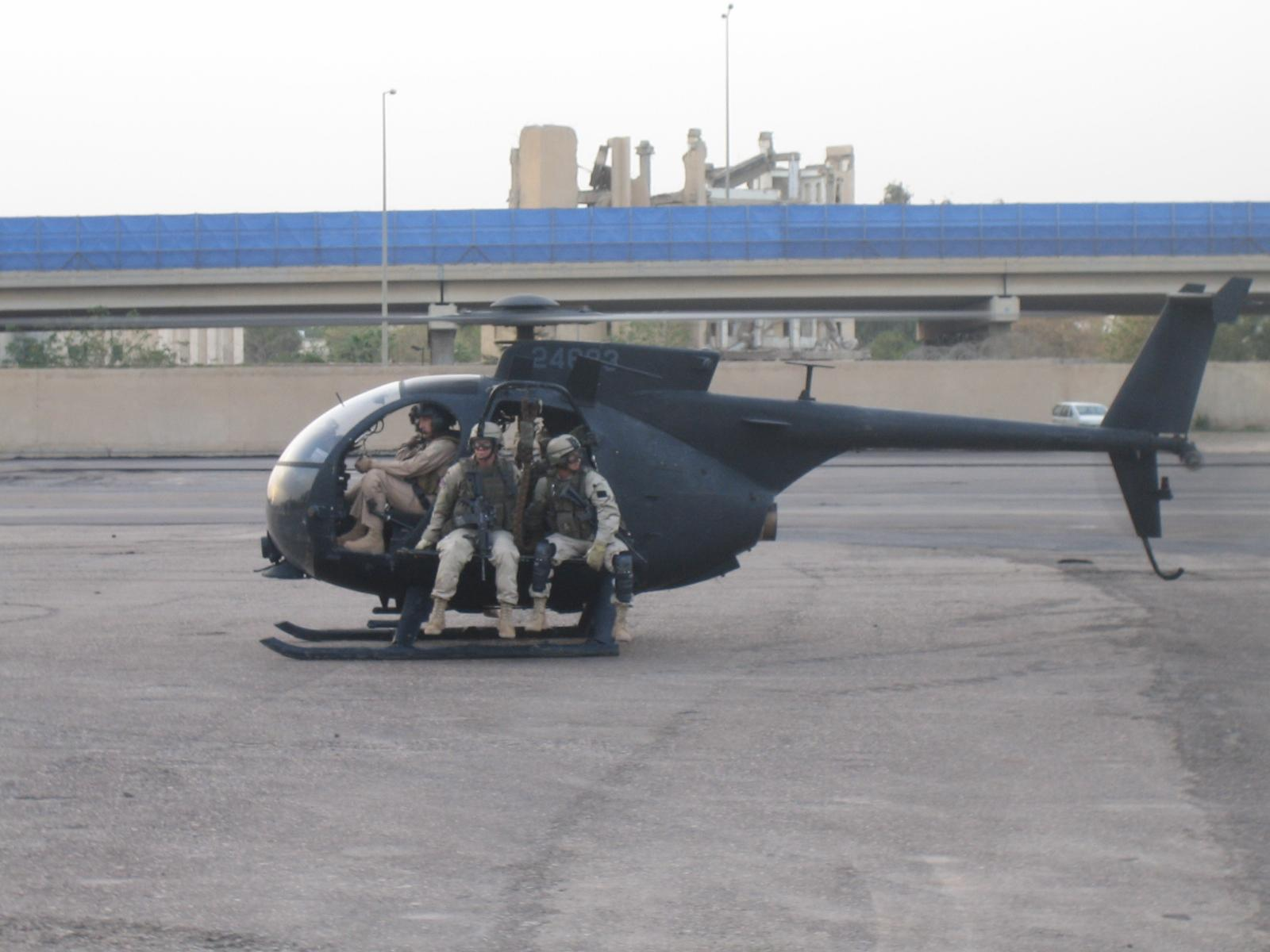
A later model OH-6 Cayuse, modified with black paint, similar to the Hughes 500Ps used in the operation.

The CIA had modified two Hughes OH-6 Cayuses into what it dubbed the Hughes 500P, also known as "The Quiet One". Numerous modifications, including a coat of black radar-absorbent paint, produced a stealth aircraft that is still regarded as the quietest helicopter ever. Its first public flight was on 8 April 1971. On 28 April, Air America hired two experienced pilots to train aircrew for the black copter; a third was hired later. They began familiarizing themselves with the craft by flying it about in the Area 51 test range in the US, and other locations.

Spring 1972 saw CIA preparations go forward. An attempt was made to train Nationalist Chinese pilots; the CIA wanted the element of deniability in case the aircrew was captured. It was believed an Asian aircrew might be deniable while a Caucasian one would not be.

While this was occurring, an air raid specifically approved from the White House "accidentally" struck in the no-strike area surrounding the objective. Also, Air America acquired two unmodified civilian OH-6s and put them into service in Laos in April 1972 as a cover for the 500Ps' later arrival in-country. Two months later, after the OH-6s had established a presence in Laos, the 500Ps were smuggled into Laos to continue training at a remote base near Pakse, called PS-44. Here, the Chinese pilots proved unequal to their task. When a Chinese pilot crashed one of the 500Ps in a night landing, the dispute-riven Chinese contingent was cut from the project. Two of the Air America pilots would fly the infiltration mission into North Vietnam instead.

A rigorous training program was effected. A mockup of the wiretap site was set up for practice maneuvers; a tree was stripped limbless and a cross spar supplied to imitate the targeted telephone pole. The route to and from the site was memorized with the aid of overhead photography. The pilots practiced flying nap-of-the-earth, including flights between the banks of stream beds, until they dropped in on the mockup. The two Lao commandos chosen to set the wiretap practiced exiting the 500P and climbing the mock phone pole to staple the tap in place. The pilots practiced setting communications relays that would return the wiretap's signal to CIA listeners.

By Autumn 1972, the mission was ready to go. However, it required certain optimal moon and weather conditions. A quartering moon was needed for the pilots' night vision goggles. A slight overcast was also desirable. When the first opportunity for the mission came on 5 October, the forward looking infrared (FLIR) camera needed for navigation failed, causing the mission to abort. The FLIR also failed on two subsequent occasions. The next attempt, during the last week of November, actually made it into North Vietnam before it was turned back by dense ground fog.

== The mission ==
On 4 December 1972, then U.S. National Security Adviser Henry Kissinger arrived in France to represent the United States of America for the Paris Peace Talks to end the Vietnam War.

On 6 December, the "Quiet One" launched successfully. It was flown by Air America pilots Daniel H. Smith and Lloyd George Anthony Lamonte Jr. Speeding east through mountain passes and within ravines the copter covered 48 kilometers at an altitude of 200 feet (61 meters). It overflew known North Vietnamese antiaircraft positions without drawing fire. The helicopter halved its height when it came out over level land. Farmers out tending crops after dark paid it no mind as it flew over. The infiltrators also had the four enemy MiG-21s at Vinh Airfield as a concern.

Having secretively flown virtually the entire width of Vietnam, the helicopter dropped in on its target. The two Lao commandos dropped the last few feet from the aircraft. The helicopter then flew off to a pre-selected tree on a 340-meter peak and dropped a mesh web supporting a camouflaged solar-powered communications relay over its crown. From there, the Hughes 500P moved again and settled into a dry streambed for a 20-minute wait while the commandos set up the wiretap. The hidey-hole turned near disastrous. A rock knifed the FLIR's liquid nitrogen tank; the resulting leak disabled the FLIR. At the same time, a radar detector began sounding its alarm. The pilot turned off the warning and settled in to wait for 20 minutes while the commandos worked. The enemy MiGs did not show up.

When the commandos deplaned, they scrambled into a bomb crater left by the previous "accidental" air raid until they were sure they were alone. From there they moved to their target pole, only to discover it was concrete instead of wood, rendering their climbing spikes useless. Undaunted, they shimmied up the pole and placed the wiretap. Their return to the helicopter landing zone, and the 500P's subsequent return to PS-44 were uneventful.

== Results ==
Available accounts do not provide details about the intelligence derived from the tap, and differ on how long it actually worked. The first book detailing the operation has the tap working until May 1973, throughout the Paris negotiations deadlocking, the Operation Linebacker II bombing campaign launched in response by President Nixon, and the end of the Paris Peace Talk negotiations. Kissinger deemed he had "excellent intelligence", even though he "never questioned where it came from." In early May 1973, the Vinh wiretap went silent. Damage to the relay was suspected. There were seven unsuccessful attempts to replace the relay between 8 May and 16 June 1973, though not by the Hughes 500P.

Another account says that ″Recollections differ on how long the Vinh tap worked—perhaps one to three months″ A declassified CIA history says the tap went off the air after only ten days, before the beginning of the bombings.

"The Quiet One" was quietly removed from its spy mission. Upon its return to the U.S., it was stripped of most of its special features before disposition. However, its legacy lives on in such features as its modified main rotors and scissor-type rear rotors on later helicopters, both found on the AH-64 Apache.
