= Flying Legend Hawker Hurricane Replica =

Italian light-sport aircraft

Hawker Hurricane Replica

General information
- Type: Light-sport aircraft
- National origin: Italy
- Manufacturer: Flying Legend
- Status: Production completed

History
- Manufactured: 2015-2018
- Introduction date: 2011

The Flying Legend Hawker Hurricane Replica is an Italian light-sport aircraft, designed and produced by Flying Legend of Caltagirone and introduced at the AERO Friedrichshafen show in 2011. The aircraft, a 72% scale replica of the British Hawker Hurricane Second World War fighter, was supplied as a kit for amateur construction or as a complete ready-to-fly-aircraft.

Flying Legend is a collaborative project between MGA and Barum.

== Design and development ==
After the initial showing in 2011, the aircraft's design was improved and a new model introduced in 2015 and kit production commenced.

The Hurricane Replica features a cantilever low-wing, a two-seats-in-tandem enclosed cockpit, retractable conventional landing gear and a single engine in tractor configuration.

The aircraft is made from welded 4130 steel tubing, sheet 2024-T3 aluminum and wood. Its 8.20 m (26.9 ft) span wing has an area of 11.0 m^{2} (118 sq ft) and flaps. Standard engines available are the 100 hp (75 kW) Rotax 912ULS four-stroke powerplant, with the 115 hp (86 kW) Rotax 914 and 125 hp (93 kW) D-Motor LF39 optional.

== Specifications (Hawker Hurricane Replica) ==
Data from Bayerl and Flying Legend

General characteristics

- Crew: one
- Capacity: one passenger
- Length: 6.75 m (22 ft 2 in)
- Wingspan: 8.20 m (26 ft 11 in)
- Height: 2.15 m (7 ft 1 in)
- Wing area: 11.0 m^{2} (118 sq ft)
- Empty weight: 364 kg (802 lb)
- Gross weight: 595 kg (1,312 lb)
- Fuel capacity: 82 litres (18 imp gal; 22 US gal)
- Powerplant: 1 × Rotax 912ULS four cylinder, liquid and air-cooled, four stroke aircraft engine, 75 kW (101 hp)
- Propellers: 2-bladed Bipala GT electric, 1.98 m (6 ft 6 in) diameter

Performance

- Cruise speed: 210 km/h (130 mph, 110 kn)
- Stall speed: 64 km/h (40 mph, 35 kn)
- Never exceed speed: 288 km/h (179 mph, 156 kn)
- Range: 800 km (500 mi, 430 nmi)
- g limits: +4.4/-2.2
- Rate of climb: 6 m/s (1,200 ft/min)
- Wing loading: 54.09 kg/m^{2} (11.08 lb/sq ft)
