= Dominican Air Force =

Air warfare branch of the Dominican Republic's military

- Fuerza Aérea de República Dominicana
- Emblem of the Dominican Air Force Command
- Founded: 15 February 1948; 78 years ago
- Country: Dominican Republic
- Type: Air force
- Role: Aerial warfare
- Size: 16,100 personnel; 75 aircraft
- Part of: Dominican Armed Forces
- Garrison/HQ: Base Aérea de San Isidro; Base Aérea de Puerto Plata; Base Aérea de Barahona
- Motto: "Guardianes de nuestro cielo soberano" (Guardians of our sovereign sky"
- Engagements: 1959 invasion of the Dominican Republic; Rebellion of the Pilots; Palma Sola massacre; Dominican Civil War
- Website: fard.mil.do (in Spanish)

Commanders
- Commander of the Air Force: Major General Floreal T. Suarez Martinez
- Notable commanders: Frank Féliz Miranda

Insignia
- Roundel

- Fin flash

Aircraft flown
- Attack: EMB 314 Super Tucano
- Helicopter: Bell 206 Bell UH-1 AgustaWestland AW169 Bell OH-58 Kiowa Bell 430 Eurocopter AS365 Dauphin Eurocopter EC155
- Patrol: Tecnam MMA
- Trainer: ENAER T-35 Pillán Flying Legend Tucano Replica Aeromot AMT-200 Super Ximango Schweizer S333 Robinson R22 Robinson R44
- Transport: CASA C-212 Aviocar Piper PA-31 Navajo Piper PA-34 Seneca Cessna 208 Caravan Cessna 172 Cessna 182 Skylane Cessna 210 Centurion Cessna 206 Cessna 404 Titan Cessna 411 Cessna 501 Citation I/SP Cessna 550 Citation Bravo Aero Commander 500 family Gulfstream II

The Air Force of the Dominican Republic (Spanish: Fuerza Aérea de República Dominicana) is one of the three branches of the Armed Forces of the Dominican Republic, together with the Army and the Navy.

== History ==
At the end of the United States occupation of the Dominican Republic, which lasted from 1916 to 1924, General Horacio Vásquez was elected president. He began appropriating funds to expand the country's armed forces, as the military had been reduced to a police force during the US occupation. In 1928 the General consolidated the Dominican Army, and passed Law 904, which appropriated $125,000 for the purchase of aircraft for the army. The passage of decree 283 in 1932 by Dominican president General Leandro Ulloa led to the formation of El Arma de Aviación del Ejército Nacional as part of the Dominican Army. To achieve this, a group of engineers and cadets were sent to an aviation school located in La Habana to form the basis for the new air branch. Until 1942 only about a dozen aircraft had been purchased.

The service was renamed Compaña de Aviación del Ejército Nacional on 26 October 1942. Whilst granting base facilities to the United States during World War II the Dominican Republic received limited quantities of Lend-Lease military equipment. In 1947 a group of Dominican Republic exiles from Cuba tried to invade the country. The government wanted to receive large quantities of bombers and fighters aircraft from the United States, but the government blocked these sales and prevented sales of the Canadian government to President Trujillo. But agents of the president managed to buy some Beaufighter and Mosquito aircraft from the United Kingdom. After signing the Rio Treaty 1947 the Dominican Republic received large quantities of aircraft, for example 25 P-47D fighter-bomber and 30 AT-6 trainers from the United States. With this influx of aircraft the Compañia de Aviación expanded and became an independent service on 15 January 1948, and was renamed Cuerpo de Aviación Militar Dominicana. It moved its headquarters to Base Aérea Presidente Trujillo, in the capital's suburb of San Isidro.

The Air Force underwent several name changes during the 1950s, being known as the Dominican Military Aviation during 1952–55 and 1957–62 and as the Dominican Air Force during 1955–57. In 1962 it again became known as the Dominican Air Force, the name is still in use today.

In 1952, 25 Vampires and 32 North American P-51Ds were bought from Sweden but similar purchases from Canada and Japan were again blocked by the United States. By 1956 the Dominican Air Force had about 240 aircraft. During the next few years most of the post-war equipment was at the end of its useful life. After the assassination of President Trujillo in 1961 funds for the Air Force decreased and in 1963 the Air Force had only 110 aircraft.

During the next 15 years the number of aircraft in the Air Force declined again and only second-line material, such as training aircraft or helicopters, were acquired. In the early 1980s the Dominican Air Force had about 80 aircraft in five operational squadrons with most of the aircraft and helicopters operating out of San Isidro Air Base in Santo Domingo.

On 22 September 1998 Hurricane Georges struck San Isidro, the main air force base, and destroyed one hangar and severely damaged another, destroying the aircraft in both hangars. After this, new aircraft entered service, including eight ENAER T-35 Pilláns delivered in November 1999-January 2000. During the same period three CASA 212-400 transport planes were ordered.

== Air bases ==
- San Isidro Air Base
- Puerto Plata Air Base

== Organization ==
Squadron	Airplanes	Name	Logo
Air command		Aerial Command	
Combat Squadron	A-29b Super Tucano T-35B Pillan TP-75 DULUS	DRAGONES	
Aerial transport squadron	C212-400, C-172, C-182RG, PA-31, Citation II, Grumman Gulfstream II	PEGASOS	
Rescue Squad	Bell 206A-1, UH-1H, UH-1H-II, AW169 EC155 BELL 430	AGUILAS	
Aviation school	Cessna 172 T-35B Pillan, Schweizer 333		

=== Other units ===
- Military Ordinariate
- Air Maintenance Command.
- Special Forces Command.
- Northern Command, located in Sabaneta de Cangrejos, Puerto Plata.
- Dr. Ramón de Lara University Military Hospital, F.A.D.
- Base Security Command (Military police).
- Support and General Services Command

== Equipment ==
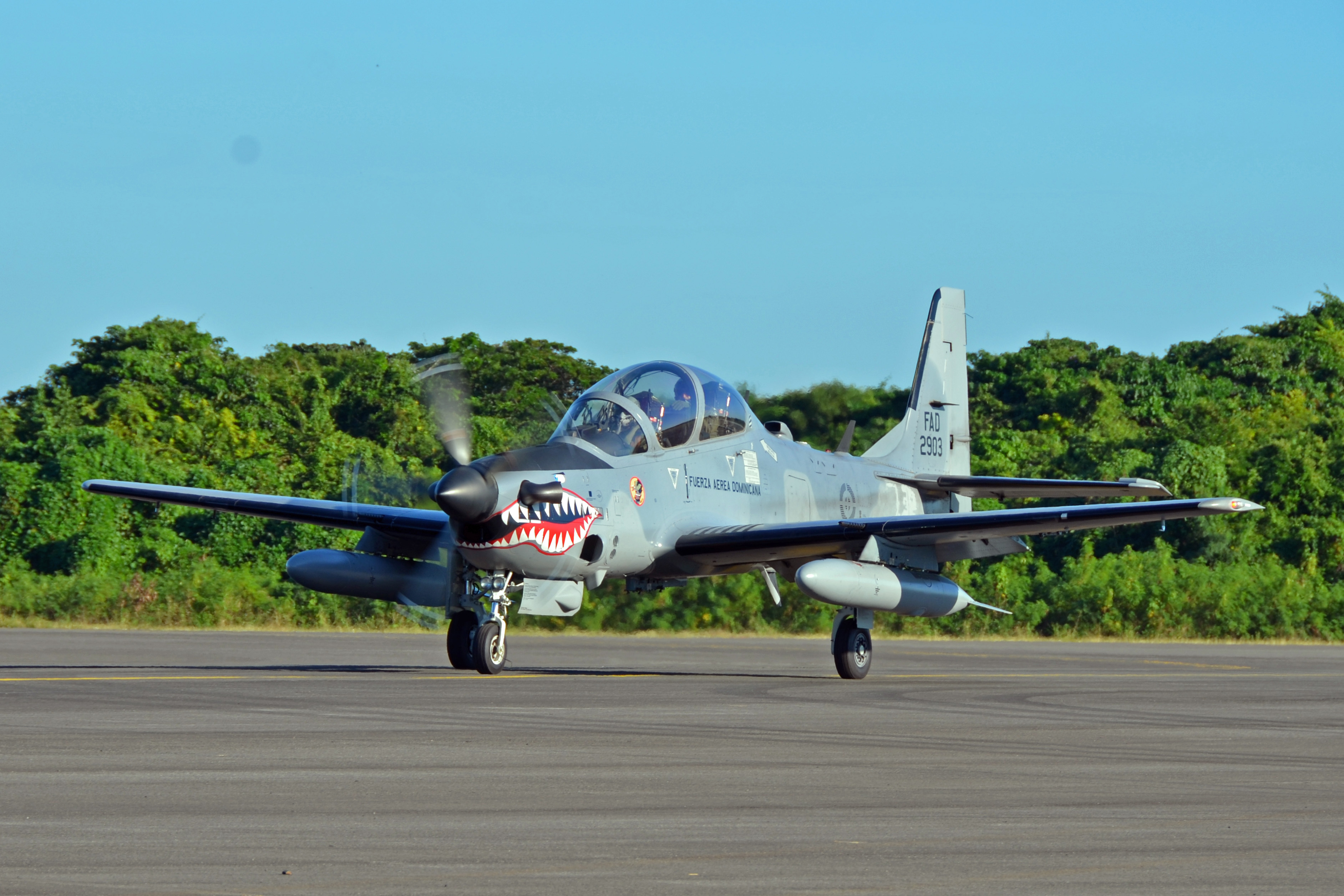
Dominican Republic A-29B Super Tucano

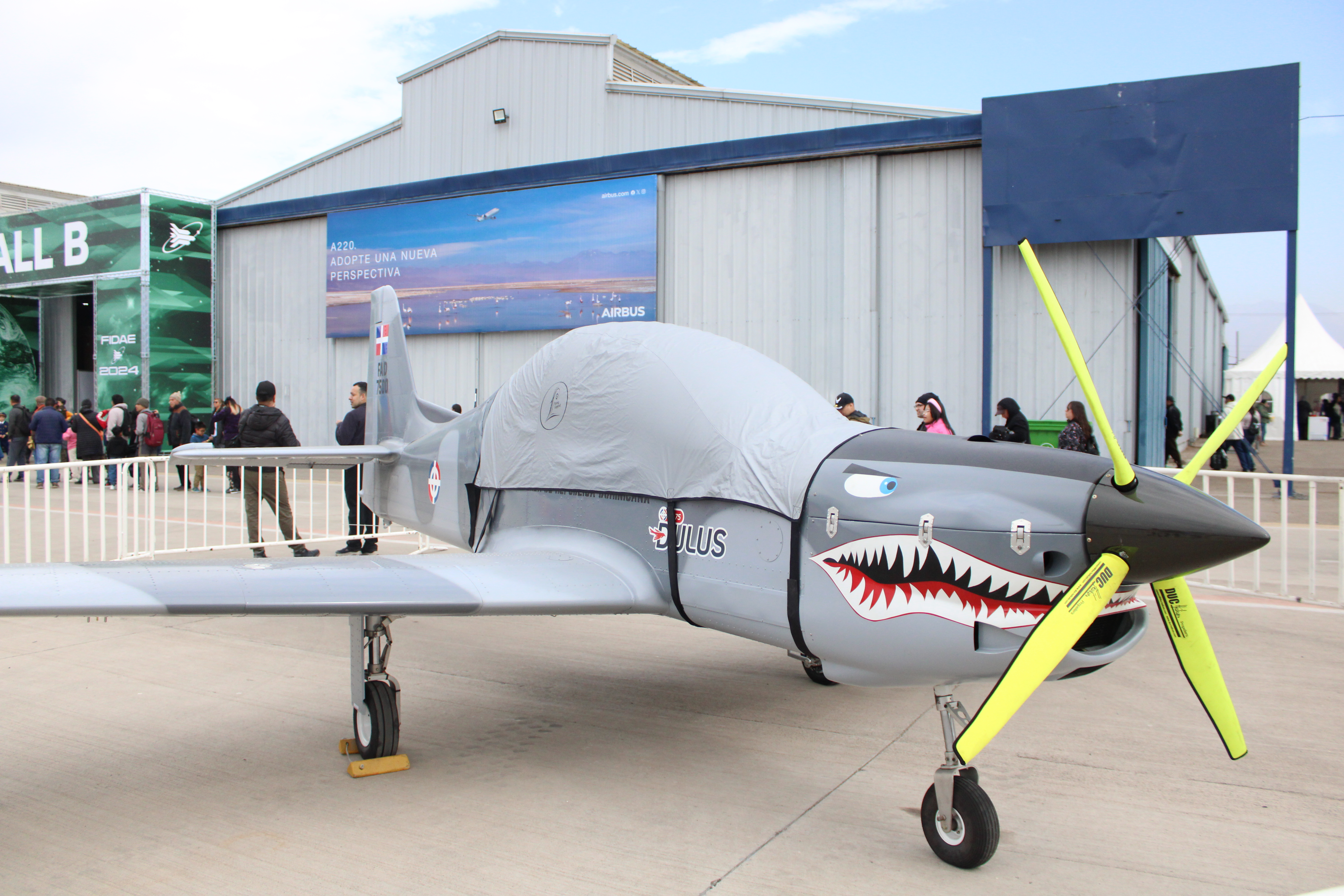
Dominican Air Force Tp75 Dulus

The Dominican Air Force was offered three Sikorsky SH-3 Sea King helicopters by its U.S allies, but turned the offer down due to maintenance costs. In 2007 the Dominican Air Force announced that it would purchase eight Embraer EMB 314 Super Tucano aircraft from Brazil. By the end of 2008 the purchase was approved and the first two aircraft delivered in 2009. In January 2015 the president of the Anti-narcotics agency announced that a Tecnam MMA (Multi Mission Aircraft) would be acquired for maritime surveillance. The contract was signed in September 2015 by Tecnam and the DRAF, with the aircraft delivered in early December 2016. The Dominican Republic Air Force the first military user of this aircraft. A Cessna Citation 501 was imported to the Dominican Republic and officially handed over to the Air Force on 14 May 2022 in two-tone tactical grey camouflage as serial 3505. In February 2024 the US Government donated aircraft to the Dominican Republic to Combat Narcotics Trafficking, with amongst others a Cessna 208B Grand Caravan aircraft. The first two out of four Leonardo AW169s helicopters purchased in March 2023 arrived at San Isidro base on 23 March 2024,

On 11 May 2020, the United States Department of Defense revealed that 10 ex-U.S. Navy T-34C Turbo Mentor would be supplied to the Dominican Republic Air Force. No timeline has yet been announced for when the Dominican Republic will receive the aircraft.

=== Aircraft ===
Aircraft	Origin	Type	Variant	In service	Notes
Combat aircraft
EMB 314 Super Tucano	Brazil	Light attack	A-29B	8	
Maritime patrol
Tecnam MMA	Italy	Surveillance	P2006T	1	
Transport
CASA C-212 Aviocar	Spain	Utility / Transport	C-212-400E	3	
Piper PA-31 Navajo	United States	Utility	PA-31	1	
Piper PA-34 Seneca	United States	Utility	PA-34	1	
Cessna 208B Grand Caravan	United States	Utility	U-27A	2	
Cessna 172	United States	Utility	T-41D / R-172	3	
Cessna 182 Skylane	United States	Utility	C-182RG	1	
Cessna 206	United States	Utility	U-206H	1	
Cessna 210 Centurion	United States	Utility	C-210	1	
Cessna 404 Titan	United States	Utility		1	
Cessna 411	United States	Utility		1	
Cessna 501 Citation I/SP	United States	Utility		1	
Cessna 550 Citation Bravo	United States	Utility		1	
Turbo Commander	United States	VIP	690B	2	
Grumman Gulfstream II	United States	Utility		1	
Helicopters
Bell TH-67 Creek	United States	Combat helicopter		2	
Bell UH-1	United States	Utility / SAR	UH-1H	14	
AgustaWestland AW169	Italy	Utility	AW169M	2	2 on order
Bell OH-58 Kiowa	Canada	Utility / Liaison	OH-58	10	
Bell 430	United States	Utility / VIP		1	Presidential aircraft
Eurocopter AS365 Dauphin	France	Utility / VIP	AS365 Dauphin	1	Presidential aircraft
Eurocopter EC155	France	Utility / VIP	EC155	1	Presidential aircraft
Trainer aircraft
ENAER T-35 Pillán	Chile	Trainer	T-35B	3	
Beechcraft T-34 Turbo-Mentor	US	Trainer	T-35C		7 on order
Flying Legend Tucano Replica TP-75 Dulus	Italy	Trainer	TP-75	3	7 on order. Locally assembled.
Aeromot AMT-200 Super Ximango	Brazil	Utility trainer	AMT-200	1	Motor glider trainer
Schweizer S333	United States	Rotorcraft trainer	S-333	3	
Robinson R22	United States	Rotorcraft trainer	R22	4	
Robinson R44	United States	Rotorcraft trainer	R44	2	

=== Retired ===
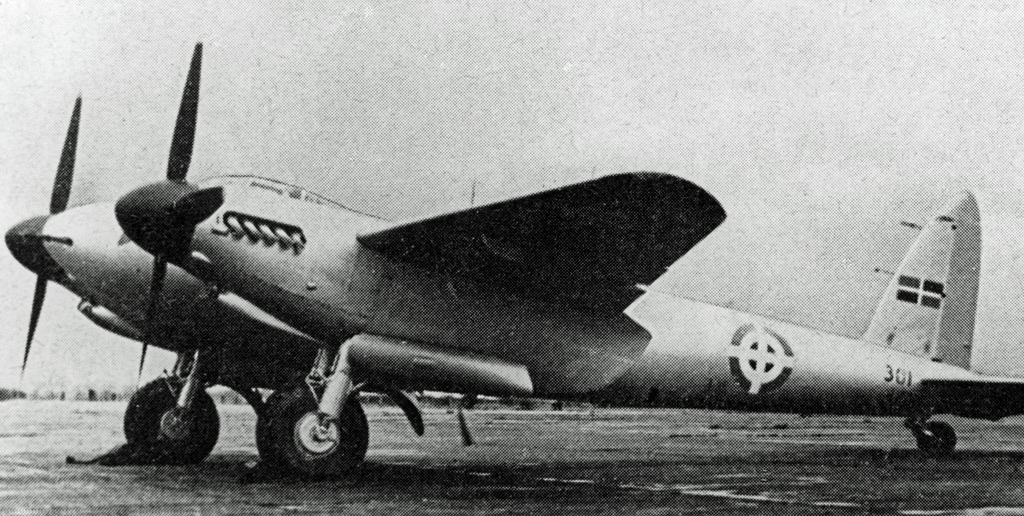
DH.98 Mosquito FB.6 301 Dominican Republic RWY 07.48 edited

Previous aircraft operated by the Air Force consisted of the P-51D Mustang, P-47D Thunderbolt, de Havilland Mosquito, de Havilland Vampire, PBY Catalina, Boeing B-17, A-37 Dragonfly, C-47, BT-13 Valiant, T-6 Texan, Alouette II / III, Sikorsky H-19, Hughes OH-6, and the Aérospatiale SA 360 Dauphin.

== Ranks ==
=== Commissioned officer ranks ===
The rank insignia of commissioned officers.

Rank group	General / flag officers			Senior officers			Junior officers
Dominican Air Force
Dominican Air Force	Teniente general	Mayor general	General de brigada	Coronel	Teniente coronel	Mayor	Capitán	Primer teniente	Segundo teniente

=== Other ranks ===
The rank insignia of non-commissioned officers and enlisted personnel.

Rank group	Senior NCOs				Junior NCOs	Enlisted
Dominican Air Force
Dominican Air Force	Sargento mayor	Sargento primero	Sargento A/C	Sargento	Cabo	Rasa de primera clase

== Bibliography ==
- Hagedorn, Daniel P. (September–October 1996). "Talkback". Air Enthusiast (65): 80. ISSN 0143-5450.
- World Aircraft information files Brightstar publishing London File 342 Sheet 1
