= Flying Legend =

Italian aircraft manufacturer

Coordinates: 37.1908808°N 14.5484437°E

- Company type: Società a responsabilità limitata
- Industry: Aerospace
- Founded: 2011; 15 years ago
- Headquarters: Caltagirone, Italy
- Products: Kit aircraft
- Website: www.flyinglegend.it

Flying Legend SRL is an Italian aircraft manufacturer based in Caltagirone. The company specializes in designing and producing replicas of historical aircraft.

It is a joint venture between MGA and Barum, organized as a Società a responsabilità limitata (Srl), the Italian form of a limited liability company.

== Aircraft ==
Summary of aircraft built by Flying Legend
Model name	First flight	Number built	Type
Flying Legend Hawker Hurricane Replica	2011		Scale replica of the Hawker Hurricane
Flying Legend Tucano Replica	2011		Scale replica of the Embraer EMB 312 Tucano

== See also ==
- List of Italian companies
