= Flying Legend Tucano Replica =

Italian light-sport aircraft

Tucano Replica
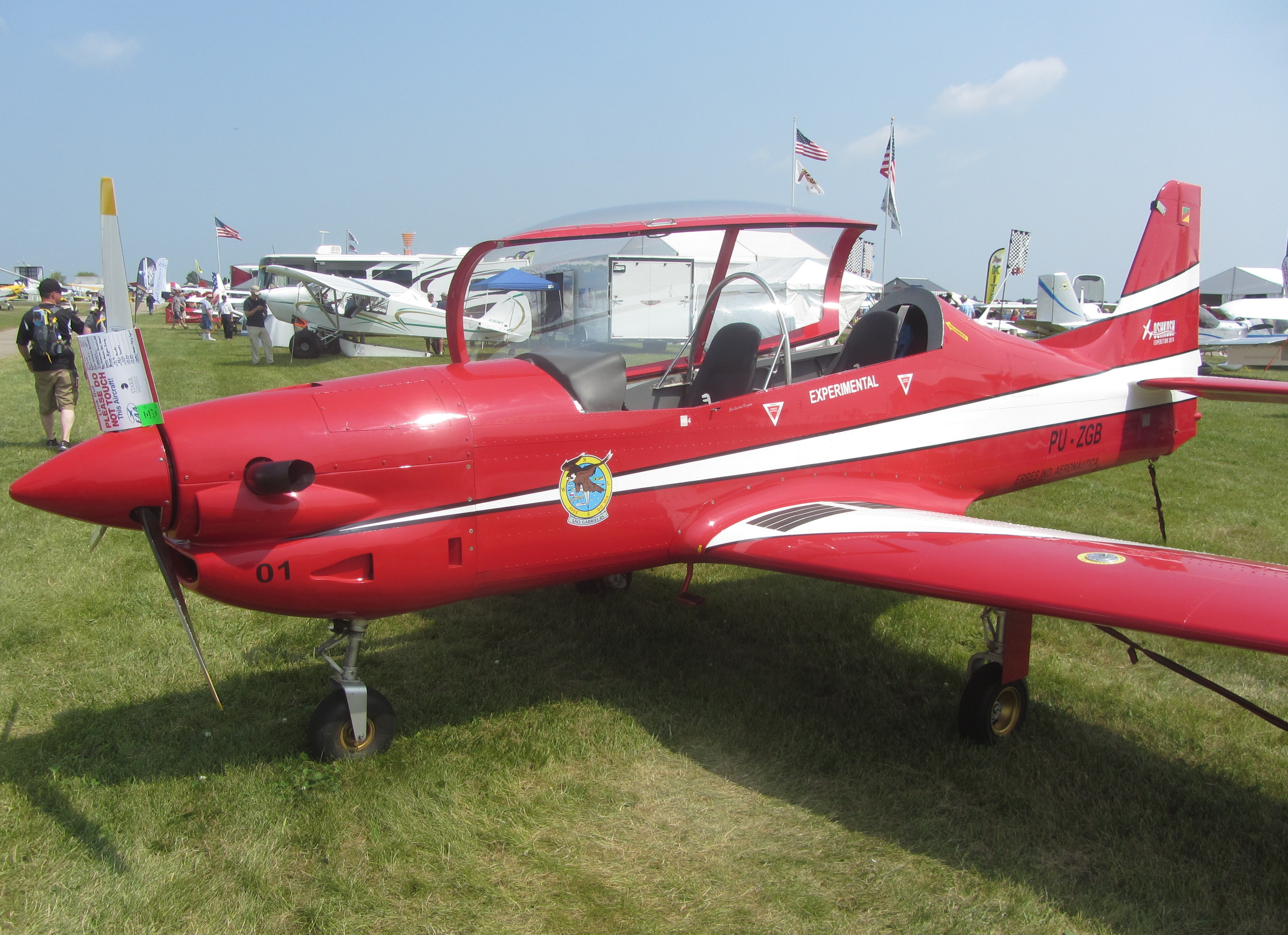
- Tucano Replica on display

General information
- Type: Light-sport aircraft
- National origin: Italy
- Manufacturer: Flying Legend
- Status: In production

History
- Manufactured: 2011-present
- Introduction date: 2011

The Flying Legend Tucano Replica (English: Toucan) is an Italian light-sport aircraft, designed and produced by Flying Legend of Caltagirone and introduced at the AERO Friedrichshafen show in 2011. The aircraft is supplied as a kit for amateur construction or as a complete ready-to-fly-aircraft.

Flying Legend is a collaborative project between MGA and Barum.

== Design and development ==
The Tucano Replica is scale replica of the 1980s vintage Embraer EMB 312 Tucano turboprop trainer and features a cantilever low-wing, a two-seats-in-tandem enclosed cockpit under a bubble canopy, retractable tricycle landing gear and a single engine in tractor configuration. A fixed gear model has been developed for the US light sport aircraft market.

The aircraft is made from 2024-T3 aluminum and 6061-T6 aluminum sheet. Its 8.41 m (27.6 ft) span wing has an area of 10.0 m^{2} (108 sq ft) and is equipped with flaps. Standard engines available are the 100 hp (75 kW) Rotax 912ULS four-stroke powerplant, with the 115 hp (86 kW) Rotax 914, 141 hp (105 kW) Rotax 915 and 125 hp (93 kW) D-Motor LF39 optional.

== Variants ==
An experimental military version known as the TP-75 Dulus was acquired by the Dominican Republic in 2023.

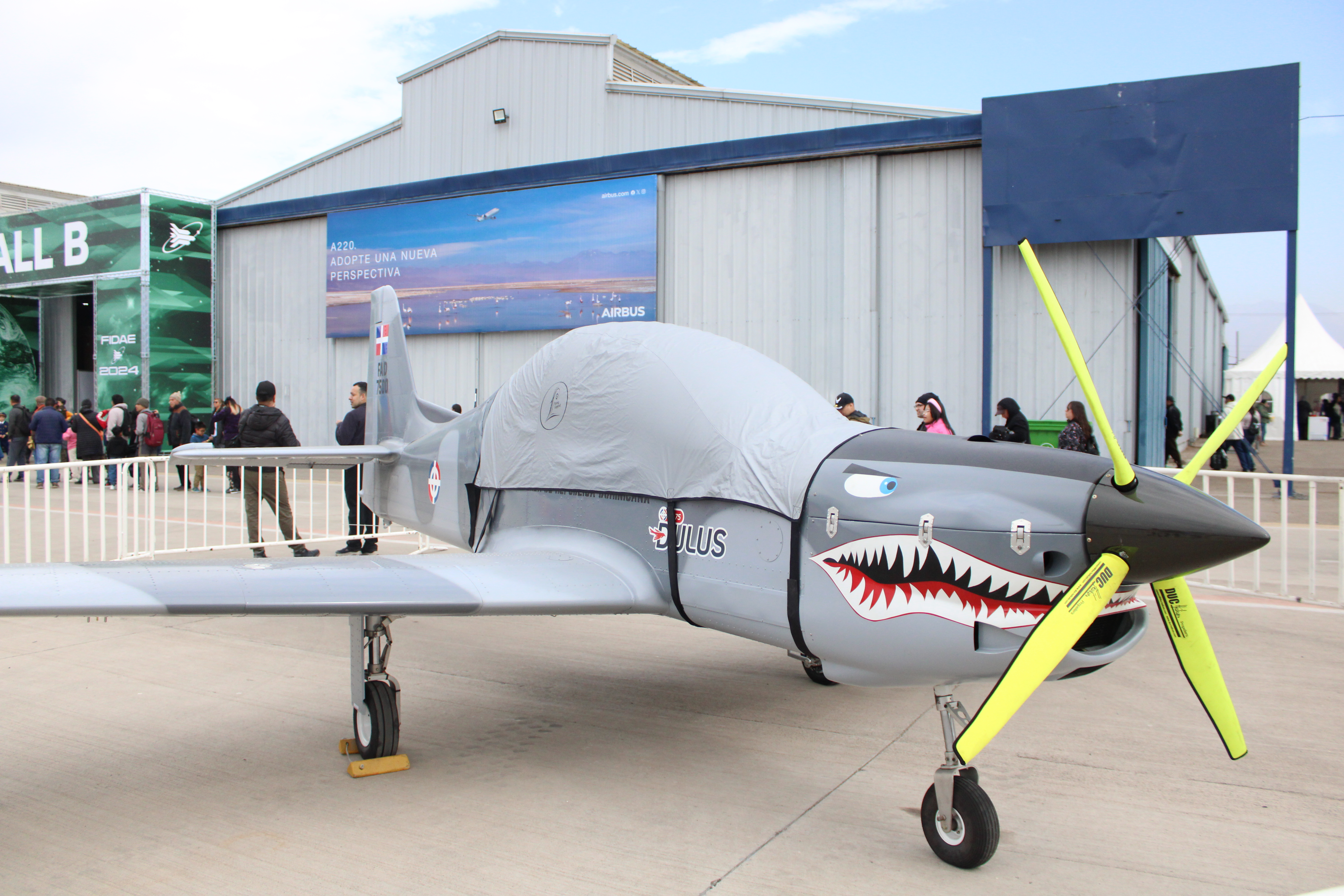
A Tp-75 from the Dominican Republic Air Force.

== Specifications (Tucano Replica) ==
Data from Bayerl and Flying Legend

General characteristics

- Crew: one
- Capacity: one passenger
- Length: 7.10 m (23 ft 4 in)
- Wingspan: 8.41 m (27 ft 7 in)
- Height: 2.43 m (8 ft 0 in)
- Wing area: 10.0 m^{2} (108 sq ft)
- Empty weight: 420 kg (926 lb)
- Gross weight: 750 kg (1,653 lb)
- Fuel capacity: 120 litres (26 imp gal; 32 US gal)
- Powerplant: 1 × Rotax 915 iS four cylinder, liquid and air-cooled, four stroke aircraft engine, 104 kW (141 hp)
- Propellers: 4-bladed composite

Performance

- Cruise speed: 300 km/h (190 mph, 160 kn)
- Stall speed: 75 km/h (47 mph, 40 kn) flaps up
- Never exceed speed: 330 km/h (210 mph, 178 kn)
- Range: 900 km (560 mi, 490 nmi)
- g limits: +6.0/-3.0
- Rate of climb: 8.5 m/s (1,670 ft/min)
- Wing loading: 75 kg/m^{2} (15 lb/sq ft)
