= Aeromot AMT-100 Ximango =

Brazilian motor glider

AMT-100 Ximango
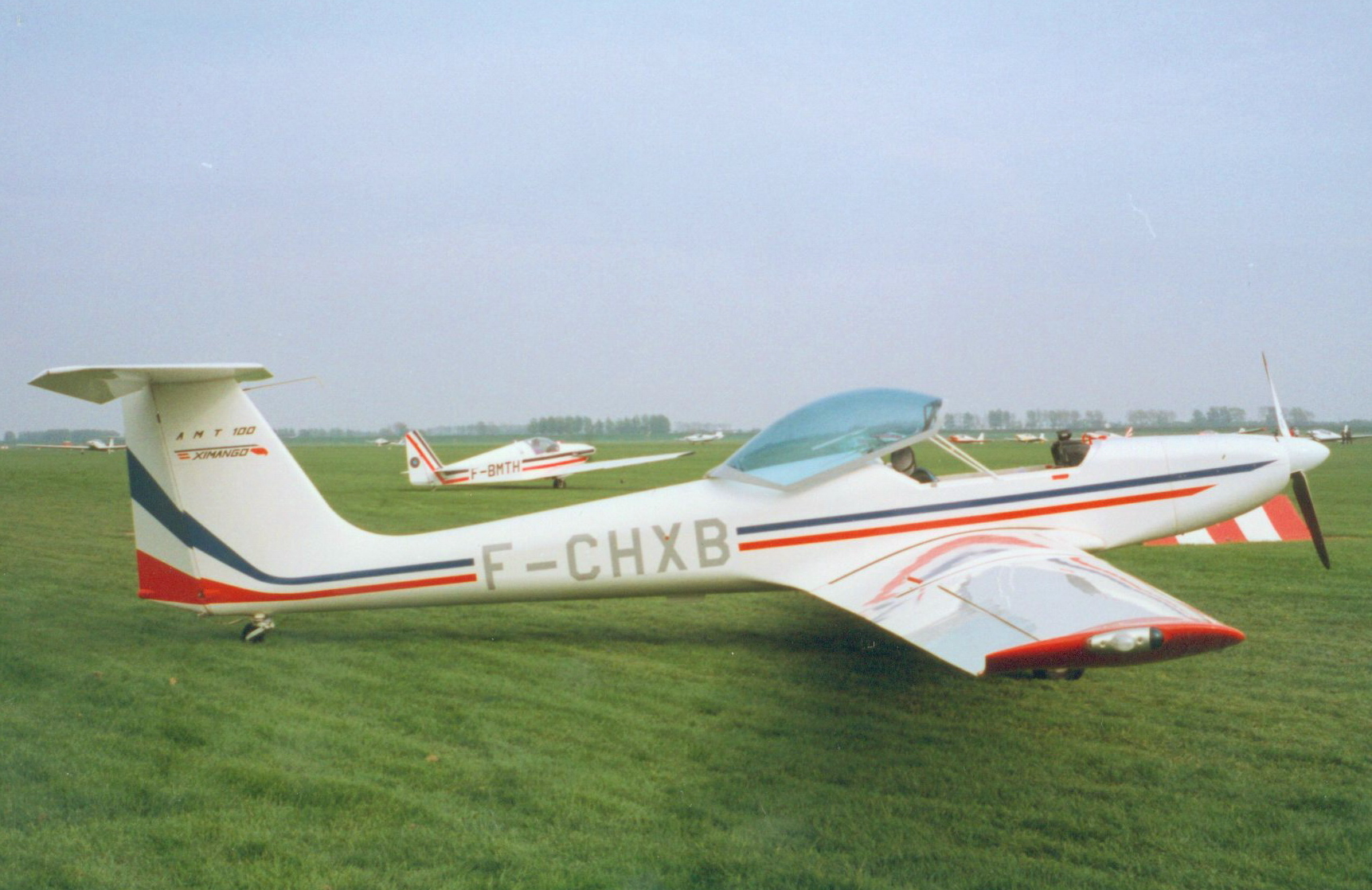
- Aeromot AMT-100 Ximango motorglider F-CHXB at Midden-Zeeland Airport (EHMZ), May 19, 1991

General information
- Type: Motor glider
- National origin: Brazil
- Manufacturer: Aeromot
- Designer: René Fournier
- Number built: 44 (1993)

History
- Introduction date: 1986
- Developed from: Fournier RF-10
- Variant: AMT-200 Super Ximango

The Aeromot AMT-100 Ximango is a Brazilian motor glider developed from the Fournier RF-10.

== Design and development ==
Built from glassfibre, the Ximango is a low-wing cantilever monoplane with conventional landing gear and a T-tail. Powered by front-mounted 80 hp Limbach L2000 E01, it has an enclosed side-by-side cockpit for two. The wings fold for storage or transportation. The type could also be fitted with an alternate Imaer T2000 M1 engine. The type was developed into the Rotax-powered AMT-200 Super Ximango.

== History ==
Aeromot is a Brazilian company that began in 1967 making seats for airliners. In July 1985 it purchased the assets of the Fournier motor glider factory in France, along with the manufacturing rights to the Fournier RF-10. The French prototype had first flown on 6 March 1981. The AMT-100 Ximango, a minimally changed version of the RF-10, received Brazilian certification in June 1986, with French certification following in October 1990.

The AMT-100 was the initial production version, powered by a 60 kW (80 hp) Limbach L 2000 EO1 four-cylinder engine driving a Hoffmann propeller. It was succeeded by the AMT-200 Super Ximango, similar in appearance but fitted with a Rotax 912A engine, which first flew in July 1992 and was certificated on 3 February 1993, in the United States in December 1993, and in the United Kingdom in 1995. By 1995 fifty AMT-200s had been sold, and in 2002 the United States Air Force bought 14 for pilot selection and initial training, in which role the type was designated the TG-14A.

== Specification ==
Data from Taylor 1996, p. 511

General characteristics

- Crew: 2
- Length: 7.89 m (25 ft 11 in)
- Wingspan: 17.47 m (57 ft 4 in)
- Wing area: 18.7 m^{2} (201 sq ft)
- Aspect ratio: 16.32
- Empty weight: 600 kg (1,323 lb)
- Max takeoff weight: 800 kg (1,764 lb)
- Powerplant: 1 × Limbach L2000 E01 4-cylinder horizontally opposed 4-stroke piston engine, 60 kW (80 hp)
- Propellers: 2-bladed Hoffmann HO-V62R/L, 1.6 m (5 ft 3 in) diameter

Performance

- Cruise speed: 190 km/h (120 mph, 100 kn)
- Stall speed: 76 km/h (47 mph, 41 kn)
- Never exceed speed: 245 km/h (152 mph, 132 kn)
- Maximum glide ratio: 30

== See also ==
Related development

- Aeromot AMT-200 Super Ximango
- Fournier RF-10

Related lists

- List of motor gliders

== Bibliography ==
- Taylor, Michael JH (1996). Brassey's World Aircraft & Systems Directory 1996/97. London: Brassey's. ISBN 1-85753-198-1.
