= Aeromot =

Airplane manufacturer in the Brazil

Aeromot Aeronaves e Motores S.A.
- Company type: Sociedade Anônima
- Industry: Aerospace
- Founded: 1967; 59 years ago
- Headquarters: Porto Alegre, Rio Grande do Sul, Brazil
- Products: Aircraft, aircraft components, aircraft maintenance and services
- Website: https://www.aeromot.com.br/

Aeromot Aeronaves e Motores S.A is a Brazilian industrial group that markets aeronautical products. It was responsible for the aeronautical system of the World Cup 2014 and the 2016 Summer Olympics. The company is based at Salgado Filho Airport, Porto Alegre capital of Rio Grande do Sul, was founded in July 1967, and also has a branch located at Pampulha airport, Belo Horizonte.

== History ==
Initially intended to provide maintenance services for aircraft, the company later went on to also manufacture components of them and to produce small training aircraft. Made the seat design for the Embraer EMB-110 Bandeirante, the first Embraer aircraft. Aeoromot Aircraft and Engines differs from the former Aeoromot Indústria, which manufactured airplanes.

In the late 1980s, it produced its first aircraft, the AMT-100 Ximango, after a technology transfer process, based on the RF-10 created in the 1980s by the French company Aerostructure, from which Aeromot bought the rights to produce in Brazil. At the height of the market, at the end of the same decade, revenues reached US$ 18 million. It also developed and produced for the Brazilian Navy, from 1986 to 1990, an aircraft designed for anti-aircraft firing exercises called K1AM, but due to the high operational cost of the KD2R-5/K1AM systems, the program was not continued in the Brazilian Navy, which opted for lighter and cheaper systems.

Between 1997 and 2001 the company designed, developed and certified, according to DAC specifications, a biplace primary training airplane, called AMT-600 Guri, intended to replace the existing CAP-4 Paulistinha and Aero Boero airplanes in Brazilian airclubs.

In 2003 negotiations for the technology transfer of the motor glider were started, with an intent to initially produce 150 aircraft, of which 50 by the end of 2004 and 100 five years later. Plans were delayed and the joint venture with the Chinese state-owned Guizhou Aviation Industries Corporation was supposed to start operations in 2009. However the plans floundered later.

Between 1999 and 2005 Aeromot created variants of the Ximango: AMT-200 Super Ximango and AMT-300 Turbo Ximango Shark.

At present the company is qualified to routinely inspect and perform Annual Maintenance Inspection (AMI) on aircraft from Raytheon, Piper Aircraft, Cessna, Embraer, Neiva, Robinson, Beechcraft, Lake and Aerocomander. In 20 years of aircraft manufacturing, Aeromot has totaled 178 Ximangos (sold to 16 countries) and 22 Guris.

== Aircraft ==
Summary of aircraft built by Aeromot
Model name	First flight	Number built	Type
AMT-100 Ximango	1986	44	Two seat glider
AMT Paulistinha		45	Two-seat trainer aircraft
AMT-200 Ximango	1993	126	Two seat glider
AMT-300 Turbo Ximango Shark	1997	7	Two seat glider
AMT-600 Guri	1999	25	Two seat low-wing trainer aircraft

== Bibliography ==
- Taylor, Michael JH (1996). Brassey's World Aircraft & Systems Directory 1996/97. London: Brassey's. ISBN 1-85753-198-1.
