= Aeromot AMT-200 Super Ximango =

Brazilian motor glider

AMT-200 Super Ximango
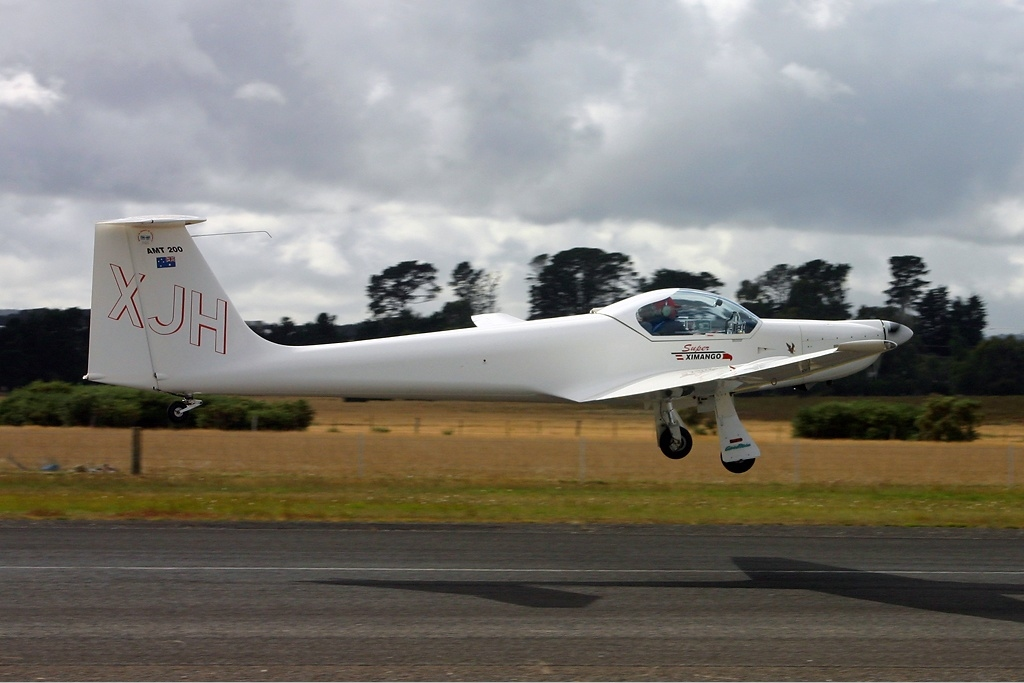

General information
- Type: Motor glider
- National origin: Brazil
- Manufacturer: Aeromot
- Designer: René Fournier
- Number built: 126 (2009)

History
- Introduction date: 1993
- Developed from: AMT-100 Ximango

The Aeromot AMT-200 Super Ximango is a Brazilian motor glider developed from the AMT-100 Ximango but fitted with a Rotax 912 engine.

== Design and development ==
Built from glassfibre, the Super Ximango is a low-wing cantilever monoplane with conventional landing gear and a T-tail. Powered by front-mounted 80 hp Rotax 912A, it has an enclosed side-by-side cockpit for two. The wings fold for storage or transportation.

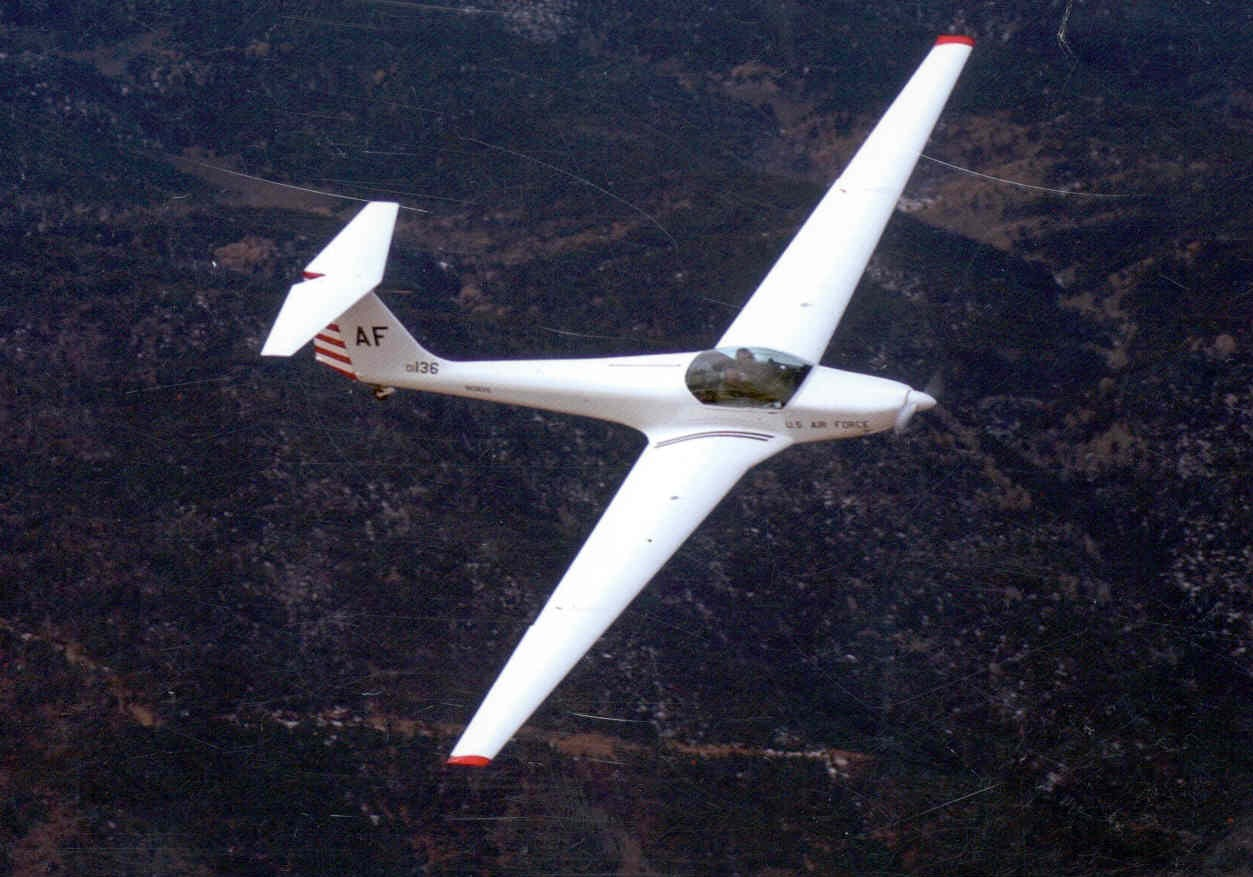
U.S. Air Force TG-14A designated AMT-200

== Variants ==
AMT-200
Rotax 912A powered variant in the Utility category.
AMT-200S
Rotax 912S4 powered variant in the Utility category.
AMT-200SO
Reconnaissance variant of the AMT-200S in the Restricted category

== Operators ==
United States

- United States Air Force – operated by the U.S. Air Force Academy as the TG-14.
- NASA – operated at Armstrong Flight Research Center as the TG-14.

Brazil

- Military Police of Paraná State – operated in patrol of environmental policing.

Dominican Republic

- Dominican Air Force

== Specification ==
Data from Taylor 1996, p. 511, Jackson 2007, p. 28

General characteristics

- Crew: 2
- Length: 8.05 m (26 ft 5 in)
- Wingspan: 17.47 m (57 ft 4 in)
- Width: 10.15 m (33 ft 4 in)
- Height: 1.93 m (6 ft 4 in)
- Wing area: 18.7 m^{2} (201 sq ft)
- Aspect ratio: 16
- Airfoil: NACA 64_{3}-618
- Empty weight: 625 kg (1,378 lb)
- Max takeoff weight: 850 kg (1,874 lb)
- Fuel capacity: 90 L (24 US gal; 20 imp gal)
- Powerplant: 1 × Rotax 914-S4 piston engine, 60 kW (80 hp)
- Propellers: 2-bladed Hoffmann HO-V62R/170FA, 1.70 m (5 ft 7 in) diameter

Performance

- Maximum speed: 220 km/h (140 mph, 120 kn)
- Cruise speed: 205 km/h (127 mph, 111 kn)
- Stall speed: 76 km/h (47 mph, 41 kn)
- Never exceed speed: 245 km/h (152 mph, 132 kn)
- Range: 1,000 km (620 mi, 540 nmi)
- Service ceiling: 4,900 m (16,100 ft)
- Maximum glide ratio: 31
- Rate of climb: 1.8 m/s (350 ft/min)
- Rate of sink: .93 m/s (183 ft/min)
- Wing loading: 45.3 kg/m^{2} (9.3 lb/sq ft)

== Bibliography ==
- Taylor, Michael JH (1996), Brassey's World Aircraft & Systems Directory 1996/97, London: Brassey's, ISBN 1-85753-198-1
- Jackson, Paul (2007). Jane's All The World's Aircraft 2007-2008. United Kingdom: Jane's Information Group. ISBN 9780710627926..
