= Fournier RF-10 =

Motor glider by René Fournier, 1981

RF-10
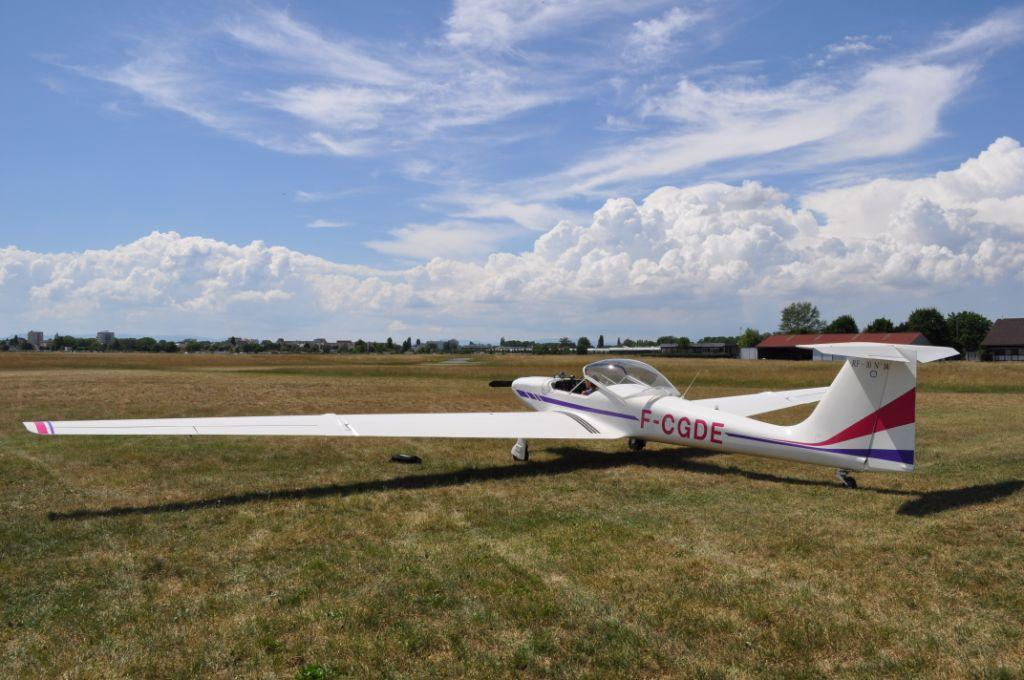
- Fournier RF-10 on the ground

General information
- Type: Motorglider
- National origin: France
- Designer: René Fournier

History
- First flight: 1981
- Variant: Aeromot AMT-100 Ximango

The Fournier RF-10 is a two-seat motor glider designed by René Fournier in 1981. The aircraft is a further development of the RF-9 and incorporated plastic and carbon-fiber structures.

The aircraft has also been license manufactured in Brazil as the AMT 100 Ximango.

== Operators ==
Brazil
Portugal

- Portuguese Air Force received four RF-10s in 1984.

== Specifications (RF-10) ==
Data from Jane's All The World's Aircraft 1982-83

General characteristics

- Crew: 2
- Length: 7.89 m (25 ft 11 in)
- Wingspan: 17.47 m (57 ft 4 in)
- Height: 1.93 m (6 ft 4 in)
- Wing area: 18.7 m^{2} (201 sq ft)
- Aspect ratio: 16.3:1
- Airfoil: NACA 64_{3}-618
- Empty weight: 530 kg (1,168 lb)
- Max takeoff weight: 770 kg (1,698 lb)
- Powerplant: 1 × Limbach L2000 EO I 4-cyl air-cooled horizontally opposed piston engine, 59.5 kW (79.8 hp)

Performance

- Maximum speed: 200 km/h (120 mph, 110 kn)
- Stall speed: 72 km/h (45 mph, 39 kn)
- Rate of sink: 0.8 m/s (160 ft/min) at 80 km/h (50 mph))

== Bibliography ==
- Taylor, John W. R. (1982), Jane's All The World's Aircraft 1982–83, London: Jane's Yearbooks, ISBN 0-7106-0748-2
- Lewis, Barry (August 1987), "Portugal's Growing Air Power", Air International, 33 (2): 66–68, 73–75, ISSN 0306-5634
