= Hiller (surname) =

Hiller is a surname. Notable people with the surname include:

- Philip Frederick Hiller (1699–1769), German Evangelical parson and hymnwriter
- Johann Adam Hiller (1728–1804), German composer
- Johann von Hiller (1754–1819), Austrian general
- Friedrich Adam Hiller (c. 1767 – 1812), German composer, son of Johann Adam Hiller
- Ferdinand Hiller (1811–1885), German composer (born Ferdinand Hildesheim)
- Heinrich Hiller (1846–1912), German artist
- H. Gustave Hiller (1865–1946), artist and stained glass designer
- Hiram M. Hiller, Jr. (1867–1921), American physician and ethnographer
- Lejaren Hiller Sr. (1880–1969), American photographer and illustrator
- Arthur Hiller (1881–1941), German football player
- Kurt Hiller (1885–1972), German socialist writer
- Marius Hiller (1892–1964), German football player
- Matthias Hiller (theologian) (1646–1725), German theologian
- Matthias Hiller (politician) (born 1985), German politician
- Hob Hiller (1893–1956), American baseball player
- Wendy Hiller (1912–2003), English actress
- Arthur Hiller (1923–2016), Canadian film director
- Lejaren Hiller (1924–1994), American composer
- Stanley Hiller (1924–2006), one of the early developers of the helicopter
- Tony Hiller (1927–2018), English songwriter and record producer
- Chuck Hiller (1934–2004), American baseball player
- Susan Hiller (1940–2019), American-born British conceptual artist
- John Hiller (born 1943), Canadian former baseball pitcher
- Kit Hiller (born 1948), Australian linocut printer and oil painter
- Holger Hiller, (born 1956), German musician
- István Hiller (born 1964), Hungarian politician
- Ulrike Hiller (born 1965), German politician
- Jim Hiller (born 1969), ice hockey coach and retired player
- Jonas Hiller (born 1982), Swiss ice hockey goalkeeper
- Carolina Hiller (born 1997), Canadian speed skater
- Scott Hiller (fl. 1991–1999), American lacrosse coach
