= Hiller =

Hiller may refer to:

- Hiller (surname)
- Hiller, Pennsylvania
- Hiller Aircraft Corporation:
  - Hiller Hornet
  - Hiller Flying Platform
  - Tanner-Hiller Airport
  - Hiller Aviation Museum
  - Hiller X-18
  - Fairchild Hiller FH-227
  - YH-32 Hornet
