= Matthias Hiller =

Matthias Hiller may refer to:

- Matthias Hiller (theologian)
- Matthias Hiller (politician)
