= Stanley Hiller =

American helicopter designer (1924–2006)

Stanley Hiller Jr.
- Born: November 15, 1924; San Francisco, California, US
- Died: April 20, 2006 (aged 81); Atherton, California, US
- Known for: Hiller Helicopters
- Spouse: Carolyn Balsdon
- Children: 2
- Awards: National Air and Space Museum Trophy
- Website: www.hiller.org

Stanley Hiller Jr. (November 15, 1924 – April 20, 2006) was an American inventor, aerospace engineer, and pioneering developer of the helicopter. Hiller founded Hiller Helicopter, a helicopter manufacturing company.

== Biography ==
=== Early life ===
Stanley Hiller was born November 15, 1924, in San Francisco, California, to Stanley Hiller Sr. and Opal Perkins. The family moved to Berkeley in the 1930s, where Hiller would grow up.

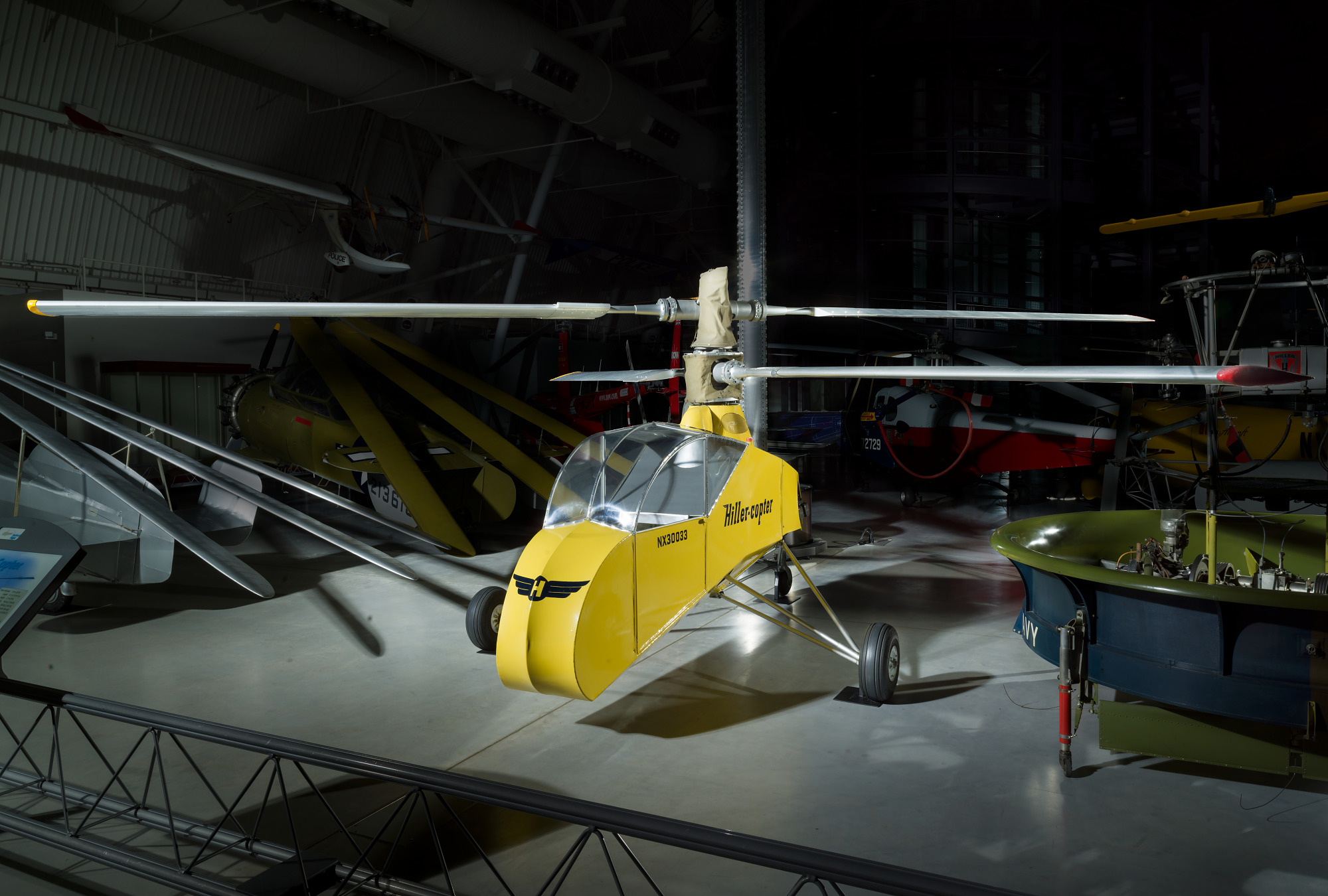
The Hiller XH-44 "Hiller-Copter".

=== Hiller Helicopter ===
At the age of 15, he designed the world's first successful coaxial helicopter, and produced a working model. At 17, he presented his design for the XH-44 "Hiller-Copter" to the U.S. Army in Washington D.C., winning not only their approval, but also a draft deferment during World War II. Immediately thereafter, he established the first helicopter factory on the West Coast at 1930-50 Addison Street in Berkeley, California. On July 4, 1944, he tested the XH-44 at the Memorial Stadium at the University of California, Berkeley where he had been admitted as student at age 15. This initial test was followed by a successful public demonstration on the Marina Green in San Francisco adjacent to the U.S. Army's Crissy Field a few months later.

Hiller, in collaboration with Henry J. Kaiser and a group of investors, founded United Helicopters in 1945, which became Hiller Helicopters in 1948. Hiller Helicopter built low-cost helicopters like the OH-23 Raven, and later merged with Fairchild Industries in 1966.

=== Hiller Investment Company ===
After merging Hiller Helicopter with Fairchild, Hiller left the aviation industry to pursue a second career as a company improvement specialist. Hiller founded the Hiller Investment Company in 1968, with the company offering to revitalize companies with large asset bases through improving efficiency, strong management, and an effective boards of directors. Hiller’s strategy often involved him becoming chairman or chief executive officer of the company, and not taking any compensation until the company turned around and realized their shareholders’ promised returns.

Hiller’s company would go on to work with businesses like G.W. Murphy Industries, which became the Reed Tool Company and was sold to Baker International in 1979; Bekins Van Lines, a moving company; York International, an early HVAC firm; Baker International, which he merged with the Hughes Tool Company to become the Baker Hughes Company; and the Key Tronic Corporation, which demonstrated signs of economic recovery by 1993 when Hiller was made chairman in March of 1992, following years of poor financial performance. Hiller's tenure at Key Tronic ended in 1995.

Stanley Hiller served on Boeing's board of directors from 1976 to 1998.

In 2004, Hiller was inducted into the International Air & Space Hall of Fame at the San Diego Air & Space Museum.

=== Personal life ===
Hiller married Carolyn Balsdon, who he had met when they were both students at UC Berkeley, on May 25, 1946. The couple had two sons, Jeffrey and Stephen. In later years, the couple lived in Atherton, California.

Hiller received the Fawcett Aviation Award in 1944 for “major contributions to the advancement of aviation”, the youngest person ever to receive the award.

Hiller founded the Hiller Aviation Museum at the San Carlos Airport in 1998.

Hiller died on April 20, 2006, at the age of 81, from complications associated with Alzheimer's disease.
