= Bremen I =

Federal electoral district of Germany

54 Bremen I
- Electoral district for the Bundestag
- Bremen I in 2025
- State: Bremen
- Population: 356,900 (2019)
- Electorate: 245,384 (2021)
- Major settlements: Bremen (partial)
- Area: 154.3 km^{2}

Current electoral district
- Created: 1949
- Party: SPD
- Member: Ulrike Hiller, vacant
- Elected: 2025

Bremen I is an electoral constituency (German: Wahlkreis) represented in the Bundestag. It elects one member via first-past-the-post voting. Under the current constituency numbering system, it is designated as constituency 54. It is located in the state of Bremen, comprising eastern and southern parts of the city of Bremen.

Bremen I was created for the inaugural 1949 federal election. Since 2025, it has been vacant. Ulrike Hiller of the Social Democratic Party (SPD) won the most votes but her party did not win enough proportional votes across Bremen for her to take the seat. It was previously held by Sarah Ryglewski (SPD).

== Geography ==
Bremen I is located in the state of Bremen. As of the 2021 federal election, it comprises the borough of Ost, the Stadtteil of Mitte from the borough of Mitte, and the Stadtteile of Neustadt, Obervieland, and Huchting from the borough of Süd.

== History ==
Bremen I was created in 1949, then known as Bremen-Ost. It acquired its current name in the 2002 election. In the inaugural Bundestag election, it was Bremen constituency 1 in the numbering system. From 1953 through 1961, it was number 57. From 1965 through 1998, it was number 50. In the 2002 and 2005 elections, it was number 54. In the 2009 election, it was number 55. Since the 2013 election, it has been number 54.

Originally, the constituency comprised the borough of Ost and the Ortsteile of Huckelriede, Habenhausen, and Arsten. In the 1965 through 1994 elections, it comprised the borough of Ost, the Stadtteil of Obervieland, and the Ortsteile of Huckelriede and Ostertor. In the 1998 election, it lost the Ortsteile of Huckelriede and Ostertor. The constituency acquired its current borders in the 2002 election.

Election	No.	Name	Borders
1949	1	Bremen-Ost	Ost borough; Süd borough (only Huckelriede, Habenhausen, and Arsten Ortsteile)
1953	57	Bremen-Ost	Ost borough; Süd borough (only Huckelriede, Habenhausen, and Arsten Ortsteile)
1957	57	Bremen-Ost	Ost borough; Süd borough (only Huckelriede, Habenhausen, and Arsten Ortsteile)
1961	57	Bremen-Ost	Ost borough; Süd borough (only Huckelriede, Habenhausen, and Arsten Ortsteile)
1965	50	Bremen-Ost	Ost borough; Mitte borough (only Ostertor Ortsteil); Süd borough (only Obervieland Stadtteil and Huckelriede Ortsteil)
1969	50	Bremen-Ost	Ost borough; Mitte borough (only Ostertor Ortsteil); Süd borough (only Obervieland Stadtteil and Huckelriede Ortsteil)
1972	50	Bremen-Ost	Ost borough; Mitte borough (only Ostertor Ortsteil); Süd borough (only Obervieland Stadtteil and Huckelriede Ortsteil)
1976	50	Bremen-Ost	Ost borough; Mitte borough (only Ostertor Ortsteil); Süd borough (only Obervieland Stadtteil and Huckelriede Ortsteil)
1980	50	Bremen-Ost	Ost borough; Mitte borough (only Ostertor Ortsteil); Süd borough (only Obervieland Stadtteil and Huckelriede Ortsteil)
1983	50	Bremen-Ost	Ost borough; Mitte borough (only Ostertor Ortsteil); Süd borough (only Obervieland Stadtteil and Huckelriede Ortsteil)
1987	50	Bremen-Ost	Ost borough; Mitte borough (only Ostertor Ortsteil); Süd borough (only Obervieland Stadtteil and Huckelriede Ortsteil)
1990	50	Bremen-Ost	Ost borough; Mitte borough (only Ostertor Ortsteil); Süd borough (only Obervieland Stadtteil and Huckelriede Ortsteil)
1994	50	Bremen-Ost	Ost borough; Mitte borough (only Ostertor Ortsteil); Süd borough (only Obervieland Stadtteil and Huckelriede Ortsteil)
1998	50	Bremen-Ost	Ost borough; Süd borough (only Obervieland Stadtteil)
2002	54	Bremen I	Ost borough; Mitte borough (only Mitte Stadtteil); Süd borough (only Neustadt, Obervieland, and Huchting Stadtteile)
2005	54	Bremen I	Ost borough; Mitte borough (only Mitte Stadtteil); Süd borough (only Neustadt, Obervieland, and Huchting Stadtteile)
2009	55	Bremen I	Ost borough; Mitte borough (only Mitte Stadtteil); Süd borough (only Neustadt, Obervieland, and Huchting Stadtteile)
2013	54	Bremen I	Ost borough; Mitte borough (only Mitte Stadtteil); Süd borough (only Neustadt, Obervieland, and Huchting Stadtteile)
2017	54	Bremen I	Ost borough; Mitte borough (only Mitte Stadtteil); Süd borough (only Neustadt, Obervieland, and Huchting Stadtteile)
2021	54	Bremen I	Ost borough; Mitte borough (only Mitte Stadtteil); Süd borough (only Neustadt, Obervieland, and Huchting Stadtteile)
2025	54	Bremen I	Ost borough; Mitte borough (only Mitte Stadtteil); Süd borough (only Neustadt, Obervieland, and Huchting Stadtteile)

== Members ==
The constituency has been held continuously by the Social Democratic Party (SPD) since its creation. Its first representative was Heinz Meyer, who served from 1949 to 1953. Hermann Hansing served from 1953 to 1972. He was succeeded by Ernst Waltemathe, who served until 1994. Volker Kröning who elected in 1994 and served until 2009. In 2009, future mayor of Bremen Carsten Sieling was elected representative. He was re-elected in 2013. Sarah Ryglewski was elected in the 2017 election.

Election	Member	Party	%
1949	Heinz Meyer	SPD	29.9
1953	Hermann Hansing	SPD	33.7
1957	Hermann Hansing	SPD	39.7
1961	Hermann Hansing	SPD	44.3
1965	Hermann Hansing	SPD	44.2
1969	Hermann Hansing	SPD	49.5
1972	Ernst Waltemathe	SPD	57.2
1976	Ernst Waltemathe	SPD	49.0
1980	Ernst Waltemathe	SPD	48.5
1983	Ernst Waltemathe	SPD	47.8
1987	Ernst Waltemathe	SPD	44.8
1990	Ernst Waltemathe	SPD	38.9
1994	Volker Kröning	SPD	43.1
1998	Volker Kröning	SPD	50.7
2002	Volker Kröning	SPD	51.4
2005	Volker Kröning	SPD	48.3
2009	Carsten Sieling	SPD	33.7
2013	Carsten Sieling	SPD	37.9
2017	Sarah Ryglewski	SPD	30.0
2021	Sarah Ryglewski	SPD	30.2
2025	Ulrike Hiller	SPD	25.2
2025	Vacant (Note: Ulrike Hiller (SPD) won with 25.2% but seat remained vacant due to insufficient second votes cover.)		

== Election results ==
=== 2025 election ===
Federal election (2025): Bremen I
Notes:	Blue background denotes the winner of the electorate vote. Pink background denotes a candidate elected from their party list. Yellow background denotes an electorate win by a list member, or other incumbent. A ✓ or ✗ denotes status of any incumbent, win or lose respectively.						
Party	Candidate	Votes	%	±%	Party votes	%	±%
SPD	Ulrike Hiller	48,670	25.2	▼5.0	42,455	21.9	▼6.9
CDU	Thomas Röwekamp	46,317	24.0	▲2.7	41,196	21.3	▲3.8
Greens	Kirsten Kappert-Gonther	35,566	18.9	▼2.5	35,822	18.5	▼5.5
Left	Doris Achelwilm	25,807	11.8	▲6.9	30,834	15.9	▲6.5
AfD	Sergej Minich	22,752	11.8	▲6.9	22,792	11.8	▲6.5
BSW					7,973	4.1	New
FDP	Volker Redder	5,590	2.9	▼4.6	7,417	3.8	▼6.1
Volt	Lotta von Bötticher	3,402	1.8	▲1.1	2,194	1.1	▲0.7
PARTEI	Sandor Herms	2,226	1.2	▼0.4	1,341	0.7	▼0.4
Independent	Judith Schultz	719	0.4	New			
FW					598	0.3	▼0.5
BD	Sebastian Kusch	800	0.4	New	483	0.2	New
MW					305	0.2	▲0.1
MERA25					159	0.1	New
Verjüngungsforschung					148	0.1	New
MLPD	Wanja Lange	282	0.1	▲0.1	82	<0.1	0.0
Informal votes		1,651			983		
Total valid votes		193,131			193,799		
Turnout		194,782	81.2	▲5.3			
SPD hold	Majority	2,353	1.2	▼7.5			

=== 2021 election ===
Federal election (2021): Bremen I
Notes:	Blue background denotes the winner of the electorate vote. Pink background denotes a candidate elected from their party list. Yellow background denotes an electorate win by a list member, or other incumbent. A ✓ or ✗ denotes status of any incumbent, win or lose respectively.						
Party	Candidate	Votes	%	±%	Party votes	%	±%
SPD	✓ Sarah Ryglewski	55,934	30.2	▲0.2	53,425	28.8	▲4.3
Greens	Kirsten Kappert-Gonther	39,721	21.5	▲9.5	44,414	24.0	▲11.3
CDU	Thomas Röwekamp	39,440	21.3	▼2.9	32,475	17.5	▼8.5
Left	Cindi Tuncel	15,306	8.3	▼3.9	15,739	8.5	▼5.7
FDP	Volker Redder	13,929	7.5	▼3.6	18,396	9.9	▼0.3
AfD	Heinrich Löhmann	9,099	4.9	▼2.8	9,835	5.3	▼3.0
PARTEI	Merle Andersen	2,835	1.5	▼1.0	1,977	1.1	▼0.6
Tierschutzpartei	Cornelia Balog-Broschinski	2,440	1.3		2,145	1.2	
dieBasis	Ronald-Oliver Marahrens	2,237	1.2		2,008	1.1	
FW	Patrick Strauß	1,853	1.0		1,473	0.8	▲0.5
Team Todenhöfer					1,455	0.8	
Volt	Michael Speer	1,182	0.6		843	0.5	
Humanists	Bennet Henking	526	0.3		325	0.2	
V-Partei3					246	0.1	▼0.2
ÖDP	Antje Piegsa	322	0.2		212	0.1	
Menschliche Welt					181	0.1	▼0.1
NPD					104	0.1	▼0.1
MLPD	Wolfgang Lange	147	0.1	▼0.1	84	0.0	0.0
Informal votes		1,337			1,071		
Total valid votes		184,971			185,237		
Turnout		186,308	75.9	▲1.4			
SPD hold	Majority	16,213	8.7	▲2.9			

=== 2017 election ===
Federal election (2017): Bremen I
Notes:	Blue background denotes the winner of the electorate vote. Pink background denotes a candidate elected from their party list. Yellow background denotes an electorate win by a list member, or other incumbent. A ✓ or ✗ denotes status of any incumbent, win or lose respectively.						
Party	Candidate	Votes	%	±%	Party votes	%	±%
SPD	Sarah Ryglewski	55,656	30.0	▼7.9	45,729	24.5	▼8.6
CDU	Elisabeth Motschmann	44,912	24.2	▼6.0	48,458	26.0	▼4.2
Left	Sebastian Rave	22,666	12.2	▲3.9	26,425	14.2	▲4.1
Greens	Kirsten Kappert-Gonther	22,117	11.9	▼2.0	23,568	12.6	▼1.3
FDP	Lencke Wischhusen	20,702	11.2	▲8.9	19,138	10.3	▲6.3
AfD	Silvia Brock	14,290	7.7	▲4.8	15,539	8.3	▲4.9
PARTEI	Fabian Siggelkow	4,744	2.6	▲1.7	3,093	1.7	▲1.1
BGE					1,124	0.6	
Pirates					1,007	0.5	▼2.1
V-Partei³					589	0.3	
FW					488	0.3	0.0
MENSCHLICHE WELT					392	0.2	
DM					314	0.2	
NPD					264	0.1	▼0.6
MLPD	Helmut Lange	350	0.2	▲0.1	154	0.1	0.0
DKP					94	0.1	
Informal votes		2,627			1,688		
Total valid votes		185,437			186,376		
Turnout		188,064	74.5	▲2.6			
SPD hold	Majority	10,744	5.8	▼1.9			

=== 2013 election ===
Federal election (2013): Bremen I
Notes:	Blue background denotes the winner of the electorate vote. Pink background denotes a candidate elected from their party list. Yellow background denotes an electorate win by a list member, or other incumbent. A ✓ or ✗ denotes status of any incumbent, win or lose respectively.						
Party	Candidate	Votes	%	±%	Party votes	%	±%
SPD	✓ Carsten Sieling	69,161	37.9	▲4.2	60,502	33.1	▲5.0
CDU	Elisabeth Motschmann	55,198	30.3	▲1.6	55,254	30.2	▲5.4
Greens	Marieluise Beck	25,342	13.9	▼3.1	25,448	13.9	▼3.6
Left	Klaus-Rainer Rupp	15,186	8.3	▼3.1	18,502	10.1	▼3.2
AfD	Christian Schäfer	5,336	2.9		6,263	3.4	
Pirates	Robert Bauer	4,849	2.7		4,756	2.6	▲0.2
FDP	Torsten Staffeldt	4,171	2.3	▼5.0	7,168	3.9	▼7.4
Tierschutzpartei					1,641	0.9	
PARTEI		1,531	0.8		959	0.5	
NPD		1,403	0.8	▼0.3	1,400	0.8	▼0.1
FW					398	0.2	
PRO					199	0.1	
Bündnis 21/RRP					119	0.1	▼0.8
MLPD		207	0.1	▼0.1	87	0.0	0.0
Informal votes		2,128			1,816		
Total valid votes		182,384			182,696		
Turnout		184,512	71.9	▼1.6			
SPD hold	Majority	13,963	7.6	▲2.6			

=== 2009 election ===
Federal election (2009): Bremen I
Notes:	Blue background denotes the winner of the electorate vote. Pink background denotes a candidate elected from their party list. Yellow background denotes an electorate win by a list member, or other incumbent. A ✓ or ✗ denotes status of any incumbent, win or lose respectively.						
Party	Candidate	Votes	%	±%	Party votes	%	±%
SPD	Carsten Sieling	62,588	33.7	▼14.6	52,387	28.2	▼11.5
CDU	Rita Mohr-Lüllmann	53,255	28.7	▲0.5	46,284	24.9	▲1.1
Greens	Marieluise Beck	31,564	17.0	▲4.9	32,556	17.5	▲0.9
Left	Klaus-Rainer Rupp	21,226	11.4	▲4.9	24,883	13.4	▲5.2
FDP	Torsten Staffeldt	13,587	7.3	▲3.6	21,021	11.3	▲2.4
Pirates					4,564	2.5	
RRP					1,617	0.9	
NPD	Klaus Baade	2,012	1.1	▼0.1	1,567	0.8	▼0.2
Independent	Jan Hövener	684	0.4				
PBC					458	0.2	▼0.1
DVU					373	0.2	
Independent	Wolf-Dieter Könnecke	362	0.2				
REP					247	0.1	
MLPD	Helmut Lange	343	0.2		133	0.1	0.0
Informal votes		2,510			2,792		
Total valid votes		185,632			186,090		
Turnout		188,189	73.5	▼4.3			
SPD hold	Majority	9,333	5.0	▼15.1			

=== 2005 election ===
Federal election (2005):Bremen I
Notes:	Blue background denotes the winner of the electorate vote. Pink background denotes a candidate elected from their party list. Yellow background denotes an electorate win by a list member, or other incumbent. A ✓ or ✗ denotes status of any incumbent, win or lose respectively.						
Party	Candidate	Votes	%	±%	Party votes	%	±%
SPD	✓ Volker Kröning	93,663	48.3	▼3.0	77,039	39.7	▼5.2
CDU	Bernd Neumann	54,538	28.1	▲1.0	46,223	23.8	▼1.7
Greens	Marieluise Beck	23,445	12.1	▼0.6	32,198	16.6	▼1.0
Left	Axel Troost	12,701	6.6	▲4.5	15,817	8.1	▲5.7
FDP	Magnus Buhlert	7,198	3.7	▼1.1	17,186	8.9	▲1.7
NPD	Sven Buttgereit	2,203	1.1		2,085	1.1	▲0.8
GRAUEN					1,804	0.9	▲0.5
Feminist					661	0.3	
PBC					614	0.3	
Pro Deutsche Mitte – Initiative Pro D-Mark					286	0.1	
MLPD					168	0.1	
Informal votes		2,799			2,466		
Total valid votes		193,748			194,081		
Turnout		196,547	77.7	▼3.2			
SPD hold	Majority	39,125	20.2				
