= United Helicopters =

United Helicopters was formed in 1945 as a joint venture between American helicopter pioneer Stanley Hiller and American industrialist Henry Kaiser. The company made a very wide range of helicopters, including the world's first successful two-seat co-axial helicopter and several single-seater "commuter" helicopters.

The company was also notable for making military helicopters, however, including the UH-12/H-23. While Bell Helicopter's notable UH-1 contains the United Helicopter prefix "UH", it actually competed directly against United's "Ten99" and UH in that case was its military designation and not Bell's designation.

The company became Hiller Aircraft in 1948. The Hiller Aviation Museum has several United Helicopter prototype helicopters available for display.
