= Kirsten Kappert-Gonther =

German psychotherapist and politician

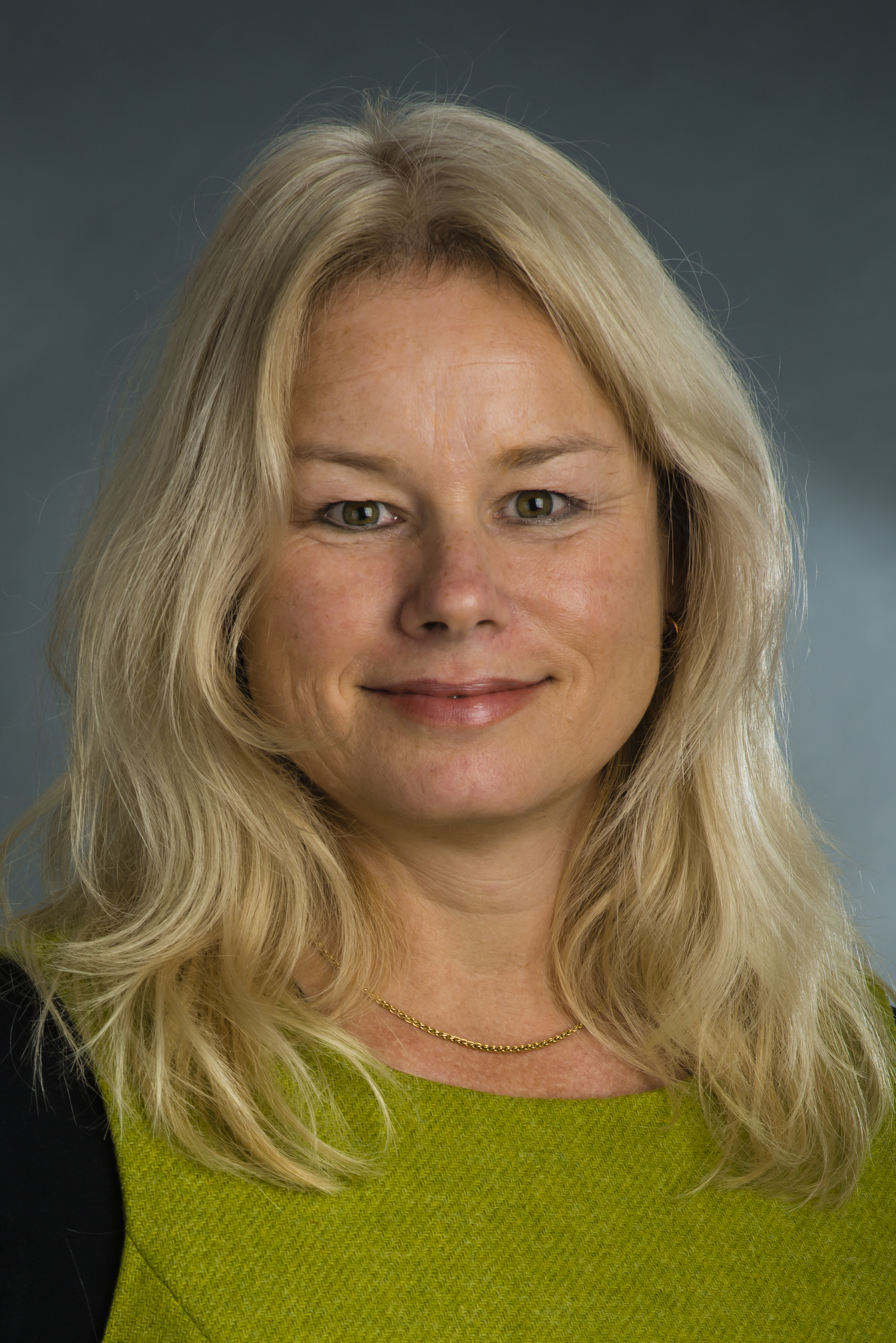
- Kirsten Kappert-Gonther in 2015

Member of the Bundestag
- Incumbent
- Assumed office 2017

Personal details
- Born: 3 November 1966 (age 59) Marburg, West Germany
- Party: Greens
- Education: University of Marburg
- Occupation: psychiatrist, psychotherapist

Kirsten Kappert-Gonther (born 3 November 1966) is a German psychotherapist and politician of Alliance 90/The Greens. Since the 2017 German federal election, she has been a member of the Bundestag, the federal parliament of Germany. She did not win the constituency mandate in Bremen I, but was elected via the Bremen state list.

== Early life and education ==
Kappert-Gonther was born in Marburg and grew up in Bochum. She later studied medicine at the University of Marburg and in Brisbane, training to become a psychiatrist and psychotherapist.

== Political career ==
From 2011 to 2017 Kappert-Gonther was a member of the Bürgerschaft of Bremen.

Kappert-Gonther has been a member of the German Bundestag since the 2017 elections, representing Bremen. In parliament, she has since been serving on the Health Committee. In that capacity, she focuses on drug policy, arguing for the legalisation of cannabis.

In September 2019, Kappert-Gonther challenged incumbents Katrin Göring-Eckardt and Anton Hofreiter and announced her candidacy to chair the Green parliamentary group, together with Cem Özdemir.

== Other activities ==
- Greenpeace, Member
- World Wide Fund for Nature (WWF), Member
