= Hiller XH-44 =

American experimental helicopter

XH-44
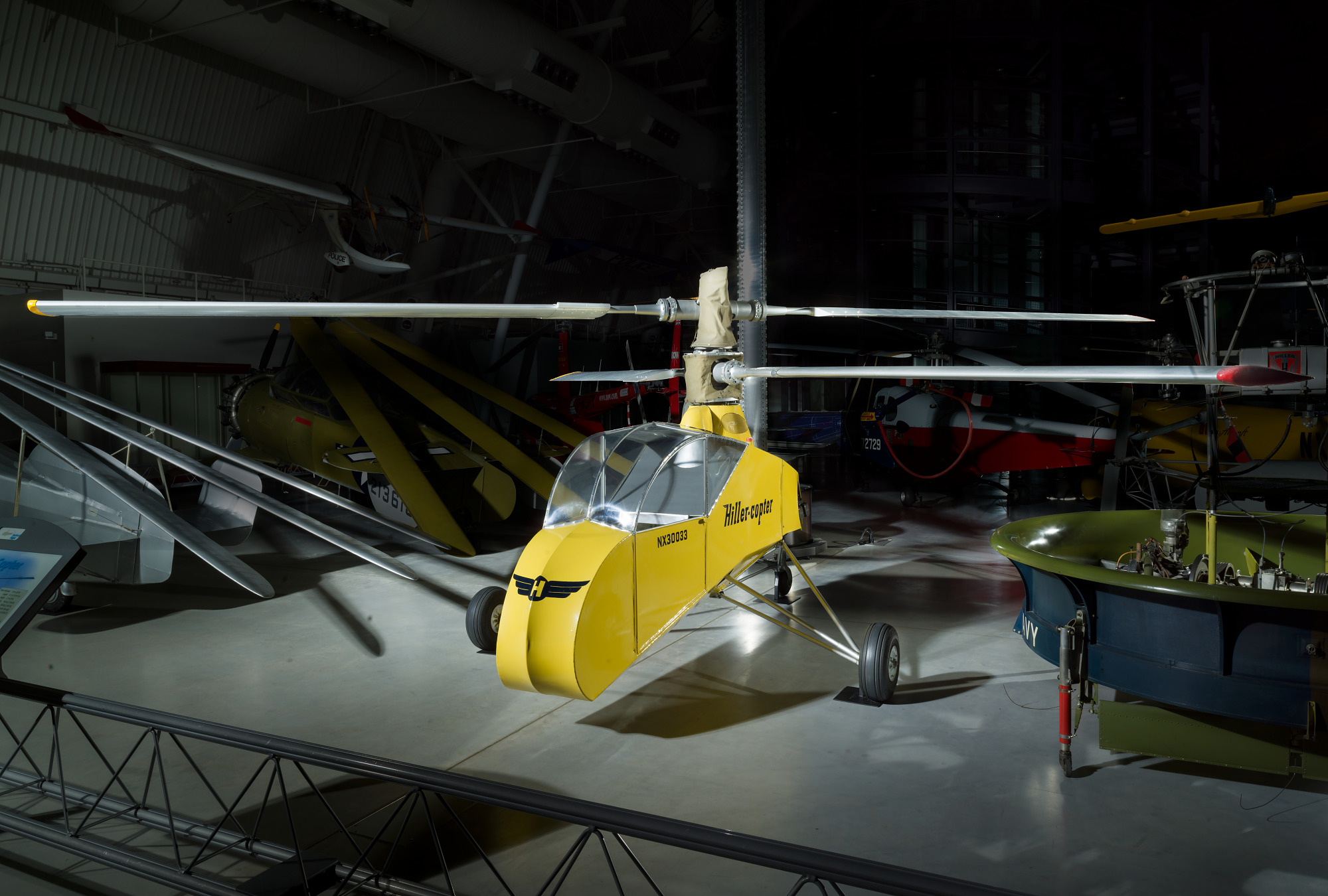
- Hiller XH-44 replica at the Steven F. Udvar-Hazy Center

General information
- Type: Experimental helicopter
- National origin: United States
- Manufacturer: Hiller Aircraft
- Designer: Stanley Hiller
- Status: Retired
- Number built: 1

History
- First flight: Unknown (tethered); July 4, 1944 (untethered)

The Hiller XH-44 Hiller-Copter (Experimental Hiller, 1944) is an American experimental helicopter designed by Stanley Hiller.

== Design and development ==
Stanley Hiller became interested in helicopters in the late 1930s, when he saw pictures of the Focke-Wulf Fw 61 and the Vought-Sikorsky VS-300. He bought every book on helicopter development that he could find, and in the early 1940s he began design work on the XH-44, at the age of 17.

The XH-44 featured a pair of contra-rotating rotors which, in its original form, was powered by a 65 hp Franklin engine (de-rated from its original 90 hp). The engine was later swapped for a 125 hp Lycoming engine. It was the first successful coaxial rotor helicopter to be built in the United States, as well as the first helicopter to use all-metal rotor blades.

== Operational history ==
The XH-44 tipped over on its first tethered test flight with Hiller at the controls, resulting in minor damage. On July 4, 1944, the XH-44 made its first untethered flight at the University of California's football stadium at Berkeley. The helicopter made an appearance during a public demonstration at San Francisco on August 30, 1944.

The success of the XH-44 caught the attention of Henry J. Kaiser, who funded further development of Hiller's rotor system.

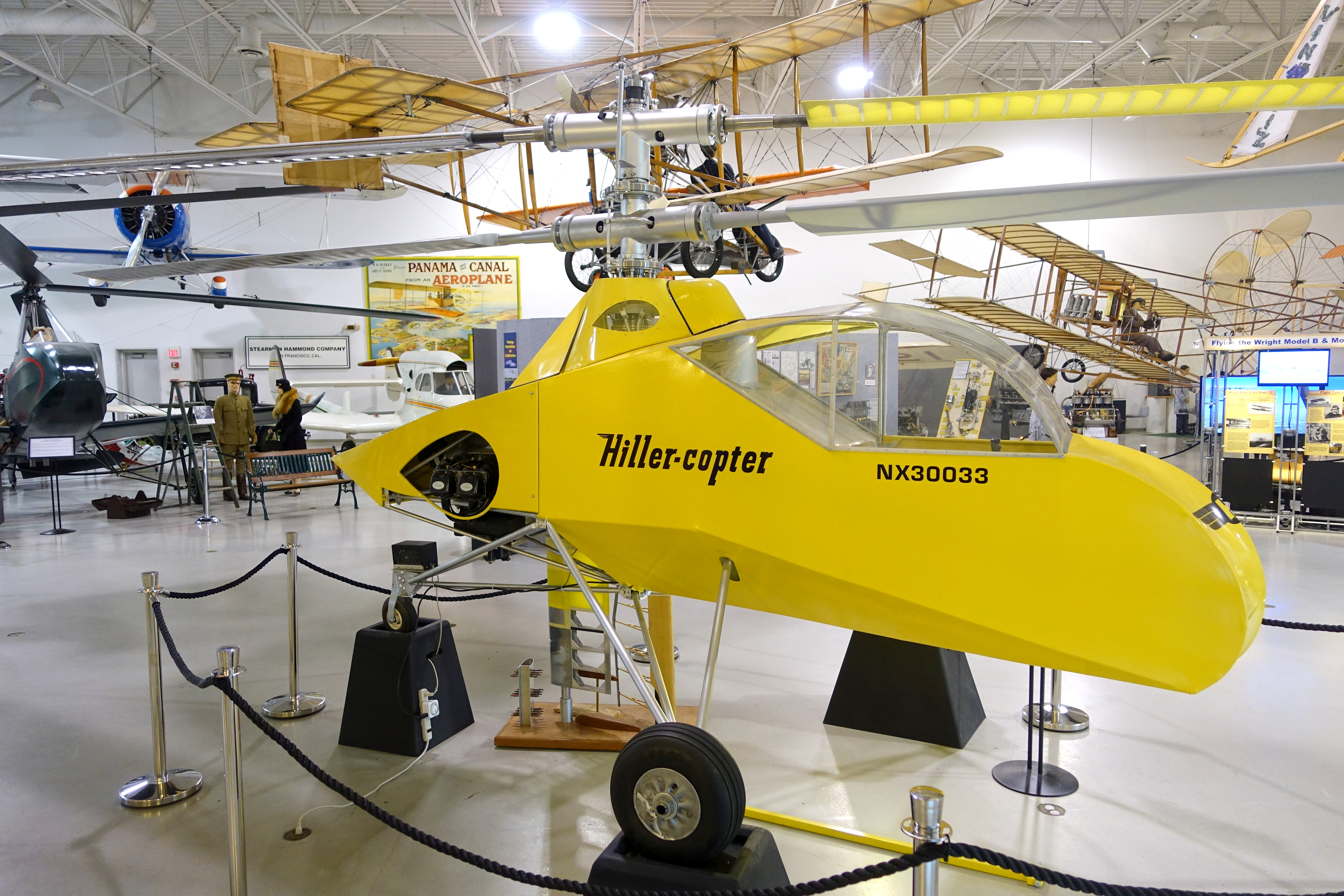
XH-44 replica at the Hiller Aviation Museum.

Hiller donated the XH-44 to the Smithsonian National Air and Space Museum in 1953. The helicopter was restored in 1974, and in 1997 it was lent back to Hiller and displayed at the Hiller Aviation Museum. The original XH-44 was later moved to the Steven F. Udvar-Hazy Center, with the Hiller Aviation Museum displaying a replica in its place.

== Specifications (XH-44) ==
Data from

General characteristics

- Crew: 1
- Length: 13 ft 4 in (4.06 m)
- Empty weight: 1,244 lb (564 kg)
- Powerplant: 1 × Franklin piston engine, 65 hp (48 kW) (original)
- Powerplant: 1 × Lycoming piston engine, 125 hp (93 kW) (after modification)
- Main rotor diameter: 2 × 25 ft (7.6 m)

== See also ==
Aircraft of comparable role, configuration, and era

- Brantly B-1
- Gyrodyne RON Rotorcycle
- Kamov Ka-25
- Yakovlev EG
