= Hiller Ten99 =

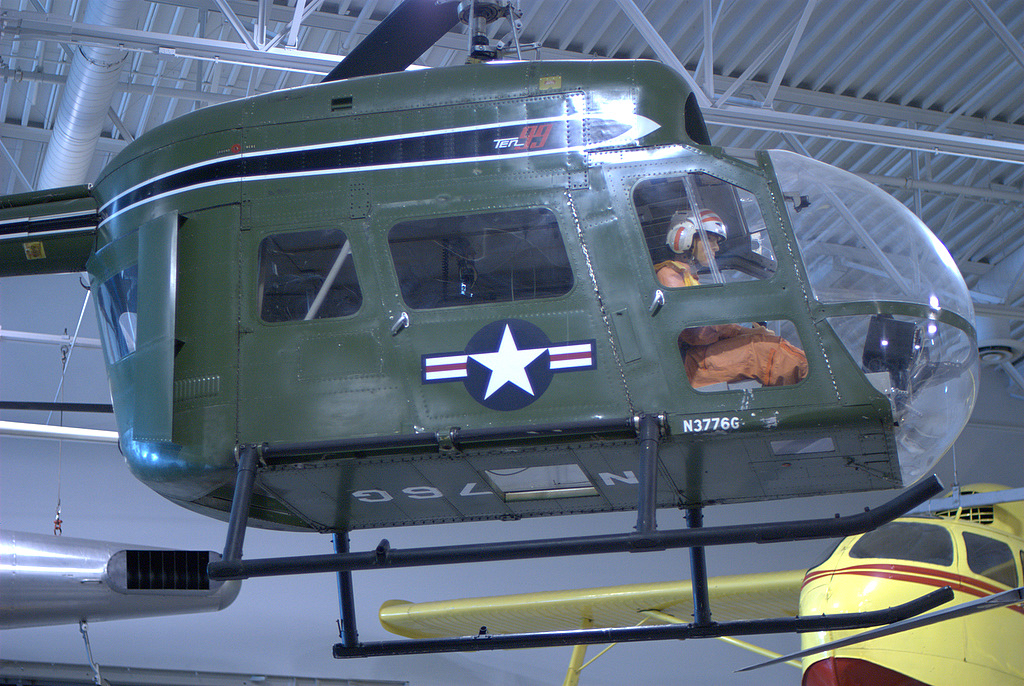

General information
- Type: Experimental helicopter
- National origin: United States
- Manufacturer: Hiller Aircraft
- Number built: 1

History
- First flight: July 16, 1961

The Hiller Ten99 (also known as the Hiller 1099) was an American 1961 experimental helicopter, created by Hiller Aircraft.

== Design and development ==
The helicopter seated six and was similar to other helicopters by Hiller, but featured a larger, box-shaped cabin. It has four doors, and a set of clamshell doors on its aft side. The aircraft was powered by a Pratt & Whitney Canada PT6, and in July 1961, was the first aircraft to have been powered solely by a PT6 engine. The Ten99 was developed for a United States Navy Assault Support Helicopter program. However, the Navy eventually selected the Bell HU-1 instead. A civilian model was proposed, but not produced, and the project was eventually abandoned.

== Specifications ==
Data from Jane's All The World's Aircraft 1965–66

General characteristics

- Capacity: 6 people
- Length: 41 ft 3 in (12.57 m) (overall length)
- Height: 10 ft 5 in (3.18 m)
- Empty weight: 1,900 lb (862 kg)
- Max takeoff weight: 3,501 lb (1,588 kg)
- Powerplant: 1 × Pratt & Whitney Canada PT6 Turboshaft, 550 hp (410 kW)
- Main rotor diameter: 35 ft 8 in (10.86 m)
- Main rotor area: 997 sq ft (92.6 m^{2})
