= Marina Green =

Public field in San Francisco, California

Coordinates: 37°48′24.05″N 122°26′20.87″W

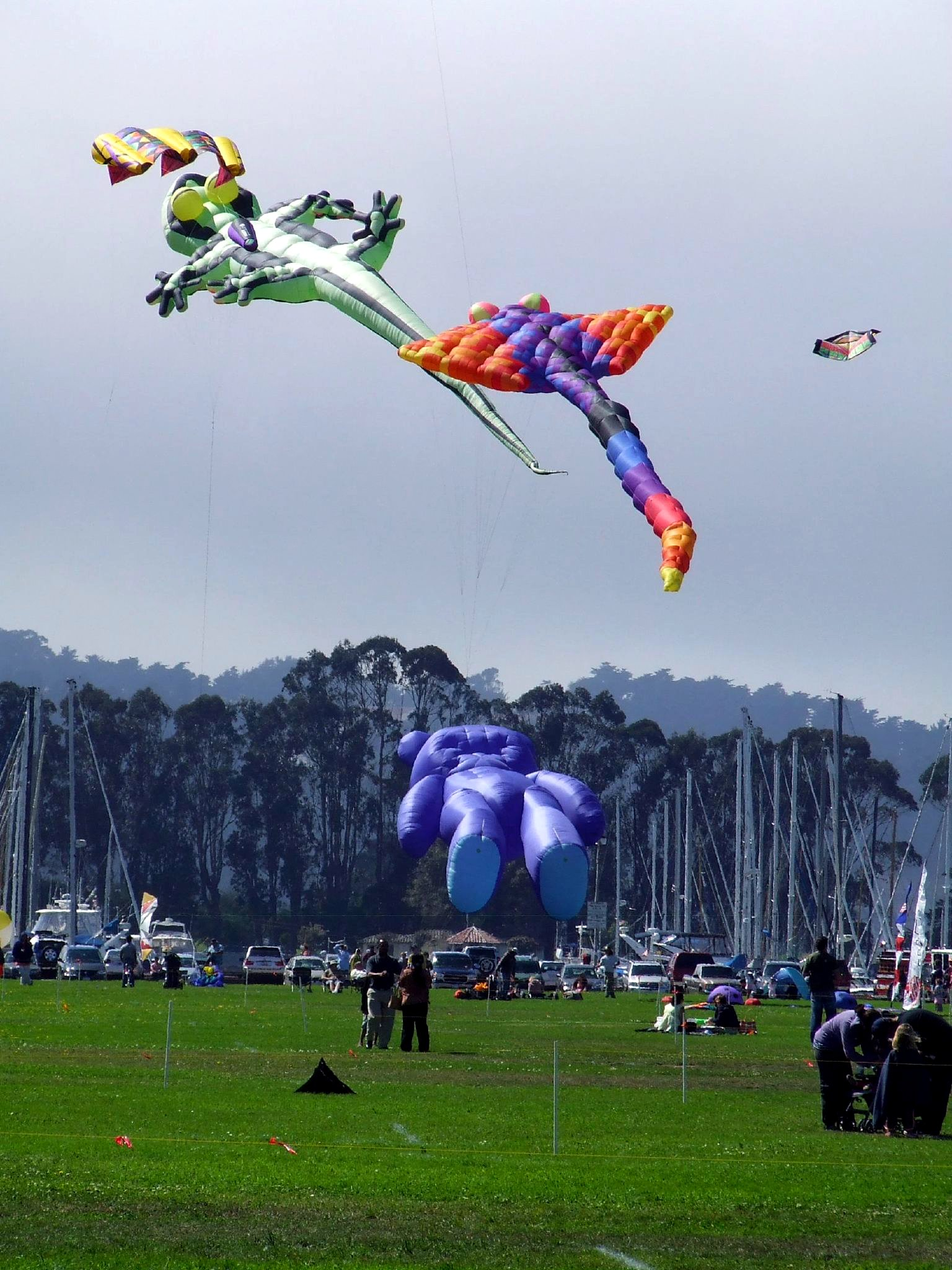
Kites at Marina Green

The Marina Green in San Francisco, California, is a 74-acre (300,000 m^{2}) expanse of grass between Fort Mason and the Presidio. It is adjacent to San Francisco Bay, and this location provides good views of the Golden Gate Bridge, Angel Island, Alcatraz Island, and parts of Marin County. Houses built mostly in the 1920s and 1930s line Marina Boulevard, the southern boundary of the Marina Green. Many of these houses have large bay windows, and Herb Caen, the late San Francisco newspaper columnist, often made references to the immaculate furnishings behind these windows. In the past, a railroad track along the southern edge of the Marina Green allowed the San Francisco Belt Railroad to serve the Presidio. Adjacent to the Marina Green is a marina, home to the St. Francis Yacht Club and the Golden Gate Yacht Club. The San Francisco Bay Trail runs through the green.

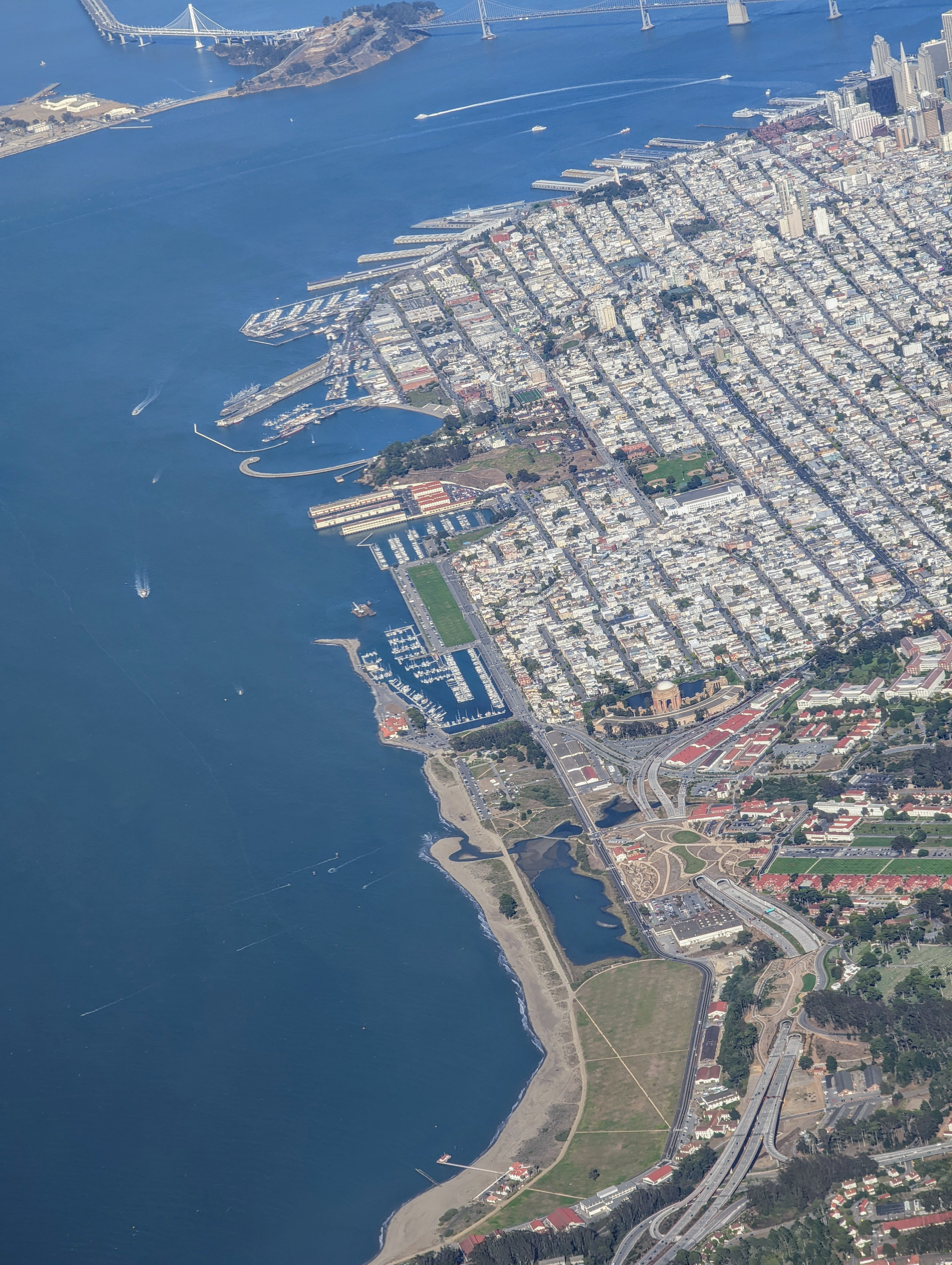
Aerial view of Crissy Field through the northern waterfront, with Marina Green the green rectangle at center; Fort Baker and piers above it

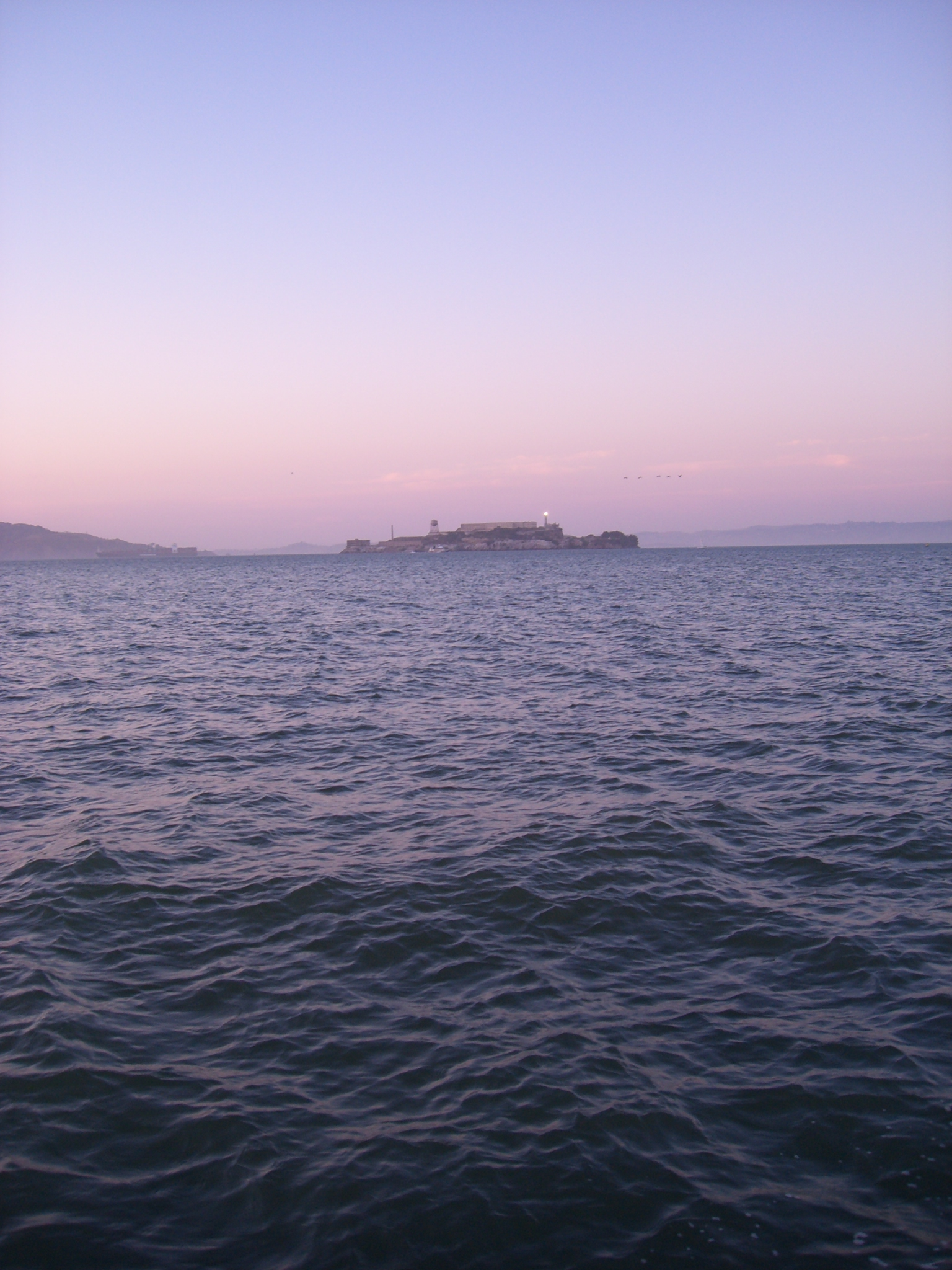
View of Alcatraz Island from Marina Green

Prior to the 1906 earthquake, this area was a tidal marsh. After the earthquake, much of the resulting rubble was dumped here. Later, to provide land for the 1915 Panama–Pacific International Exposition, this site and the adjacent neighborhood (now the present day Marina District) was filled in. A nearby remnant of the Exposition is the restored Palace of Fine Arts.

For a short time beginning September 9, 1920, through 1944, Marina Green served as Montgomery Airfield named in honor of pioneer aviator John J. Montgomery and also as Marina Airfield and was the first terminus of the United States Post Office Department Transcontinental Air Mail Service coast to coast air mail route. In 1944, the Marina Green also served as the location for the first public flight of the Hiller XH-44 helicopter, the first coaxial helicopter to fly in America, an aircraft currently in the collection of the Smithsonian Institution.

The San Francisco Parks and Recreation Department administers the Marina Green.

== See also ==
- 49-Mile Scenic Drive
