= Marius Hiller =

Footballer (1892–1964)

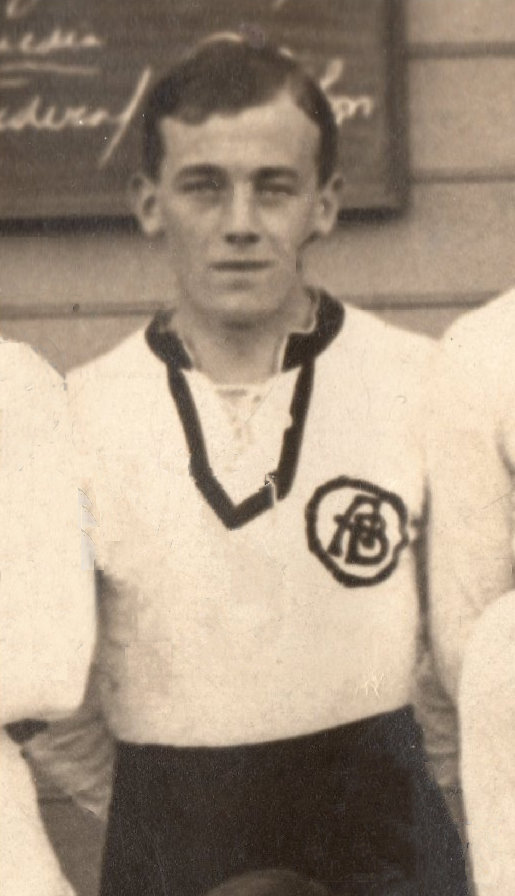
- Hiller with All Boys in 1914

Personal information
- Date of birth: 5 August 1892
- Place of birth: Pforzheim, Germany
- Date of death: 17 October 1964 (aged 72)
- Place of death: Buenos Aires, Argentina
- Position: Midfielder

Senior career*
Years	Team	Apps	(Gls)
1909–1911	1. FC Pforzheim		
1911–1913	FC La Chaux-de-Fonds		
1913–1917	All Boys		
1917–1919	River Plate		
1919–1920	1. FC Pforzheim		
1920–1925	Gimnasia y Esgrima (LP)		

International career
1910–1911	Germany	3	(1)
1916	Argentina	2	(4)
- * Club domestic league appearances and goals

Marius Hiller, also known as Eduardo Hiller (5 August 1892 – 17 October 1964), was a footballer who played international football for both Germany and Argentina. He was the nephew of fellow German international Arthur Hiller.

In Germany he played for 1. FC Pforzheim and three times for the Germany national team, where he remains the youngest ever scorer and second youngest player ever.
