= Hiller OH-23 Raven =

Family of light helicopters

OH-23 Raven
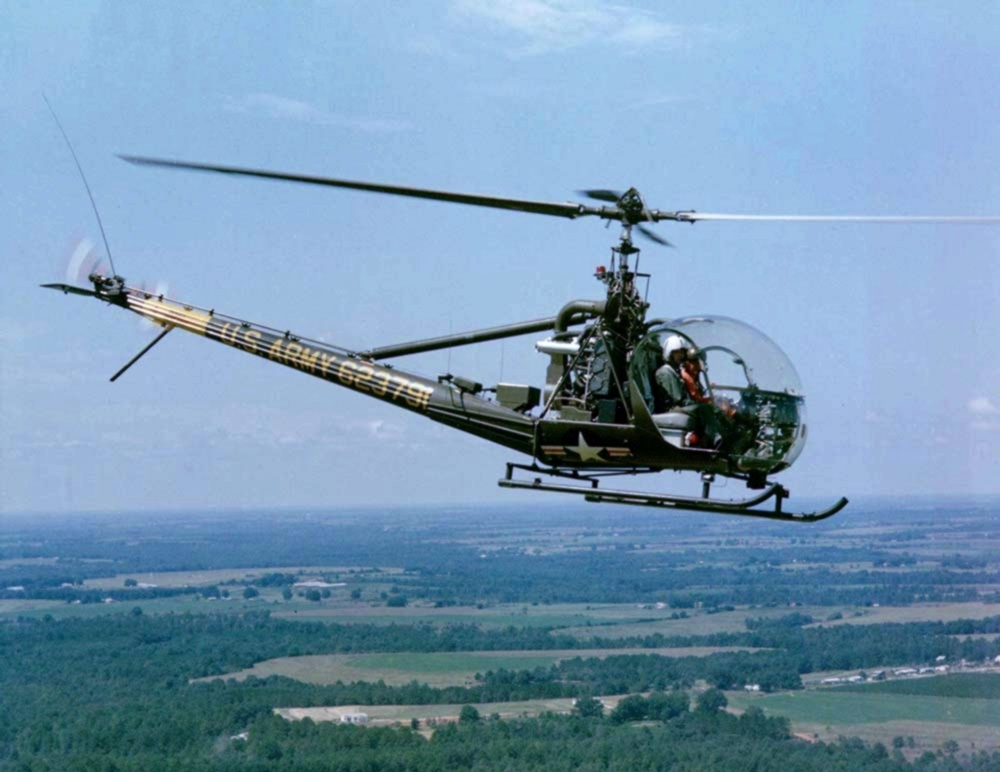
- Hiller OH-23G Raven

General information
- Type: Multipurpose light helicopter
- Manufacturer: United Helicopters; Hiller Aircraft
- Status: Retired
- Primary users: United States Army Colombian Air Force; Royal Navy
- Number built: 2,000+

History
- Manufactured: 1948–1965
- Introduction date: 1948
- First flight: 1948

The Hiller OH-23 Raven is a two, three, or four-place, military light observation helicopter based on the Hiller Model 360. The Model 360 was designated by the company as the UH-12 ("UH" for United Helicopters), which was first flown in 1948. Initially it was a two-place helicopter powered by a piston engine that entered service in the late 1940s, it went on to be a popular military and civilian light helicopter in the late 20th century.

A Hiller UH-12 was the first helicopter to make a transcontinental flight across the USA, in 1949. It served in the Korean War with U.N. forces and also in Vietnam. It was an important early helicopter and was widely used internationally, in U.K. service it was called the Hiller HT Mk 1 and Mk 2, and the U.S. Navy also used it as the HTE-1 for training. It was sold commercially as the UH-12 (This was a company designation not military), though some military operators used the company designation. Some later models were designed for turbine power, and a version with 4-seats was also sold. In Canada, UH-13E served the military as the CH-112 Nomad.

Hiller was taken over by Fairchild in 1964. A new company, Hiller Aviation, took over support of some UH-12 variants in the 1970s, and later became Rogerson Hiller.

== Development ==
In 1947, United Helicopters (later renamed Hiller Aircraft) developed the prototype Model 360X helicopter. A year later, on 14 October 1948 the Civil Aeronautics Authority (CAA) issued a production certificate for the Model 360. United Helicopters began producing the Model 360 as the UH-12. In 1949, the UH-12 became the first helicopter to make a transcontinental flight from California to New York. When Hiller upgraded the engine and the rotor blades, the company designated the new model as the UH-12A. The UH-12A would be adopted by both the French and United States militaries, as well as being used by civil commercial operators in several countries.

The helicopter began production in the late 40s and had a trial by fire in the Korean war; a lot of hard won lessons resulted in the B model, the UH-13B and production capacity greatly increased in this period.

It was produced until 1965, with over 2,000 produced.

== Operational history ==
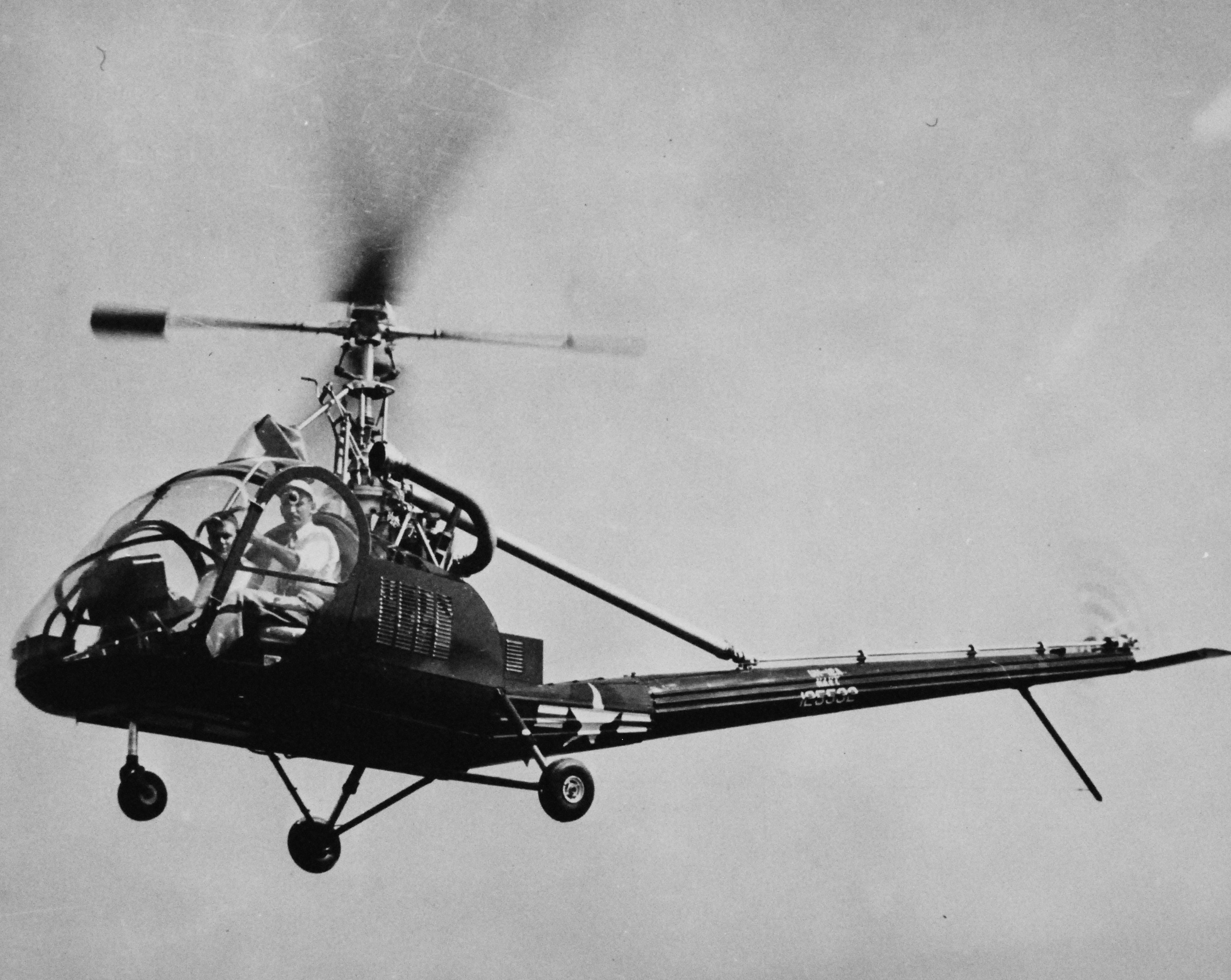
HTE-1 of the U.S. Navy, used for training, 1950

The H-23 Raven performed as a utility, observation, and MedEvac helicopter during the Korean War. Model numbers ranged A through D, F and G. The H-23A had a sloping front windshield. The H-23B was used as a primary helicopter trainer. Beginning with the UH-23C, all later models featured the "Goldfish bowl" canopy similar to the Bell 47.

The Raven used Hiller's "Rotor-Matic" cyclic control system, with two small servo rotor paddles offset 90 degrees to the main rotor blades. The paddles were attached to the control column, so that movement of the column would cause the pitch of the servo paddles to change, loading the main rotor blade so that the desired cyclic changes to the rotor occurred. The OH-23 had a top speed of 97 mph (156 km/h; 84 kn). The Raven had a two-bladed main rotor, a metal two-bladed tail rotor. Both the OH-23B and the OH-23C were powered by one Franklin O-335-5D engine.

The OH-23D was a purely military version with a Lycoming O-435-23C engine and a more reliable transmission. Most OH-23Ds were replaced by the OH-23G, the most common version of the Raven, with a more powerful Lycoming O-540-9A six-cylinder, horizontally opposed, air-cooled 305 hp (227 kW) engine. The OH-23G could seat three. The MEDEVAC version carried two external skid-mounted litters or pods. The Raven saw service as a scout during the early part of the Vietnam War before being replaced by the Hughes OH-6A Cayuse in early 1968. A Raven piloted by Hugh Thompson, Jr. played a crucial role in curtailing the My Lai Massacre. When a Raven of the 59th Aviation Company strayed north of the Korean DMZ in August 1969 it was shot down and the crew were kept prisoner until released on December 2.

The Raven could be armed with twin M37C .30-caliber machine guns on the XM1 armament subsystem or twin M60C 7.62 mm machine guns on the M2 armament subsystem. The XM76 sighting system was used for aiming the guns.

The Royal Navy's No. 705 Training Squadron used Hiller HTE-2s for several years from 1953 and later operated Hiller 12E's for many further years as its basic helicopter trainer based at RNAS Culdrose located in Cornwall, England.

== Variants ==
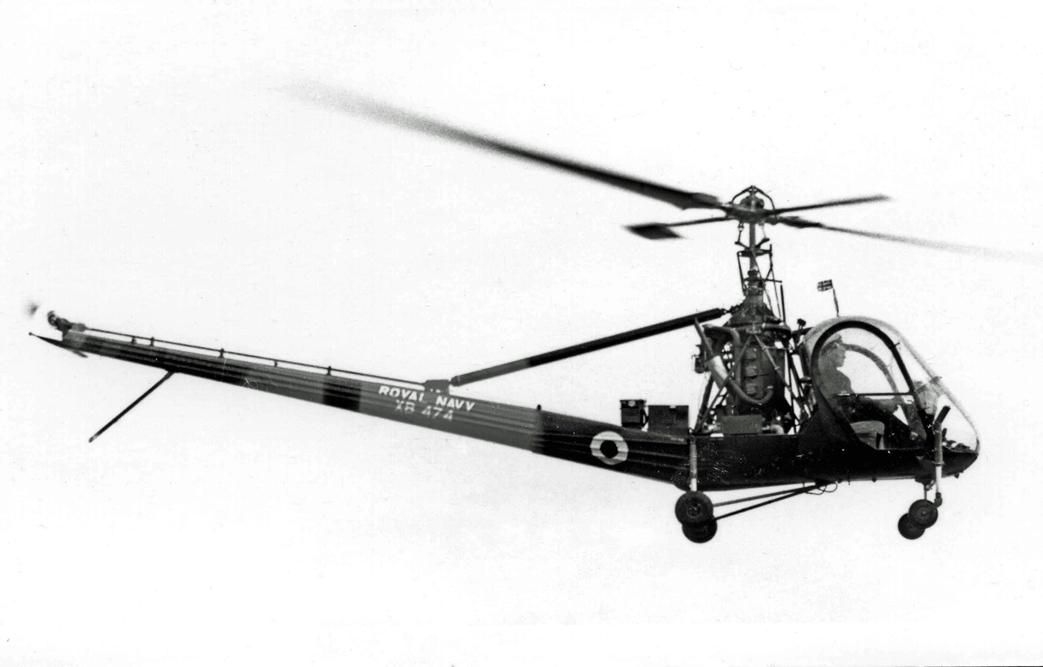
Royal Navy Hiller HTMk1 (HTE-2) of 705 Squadron in 1953

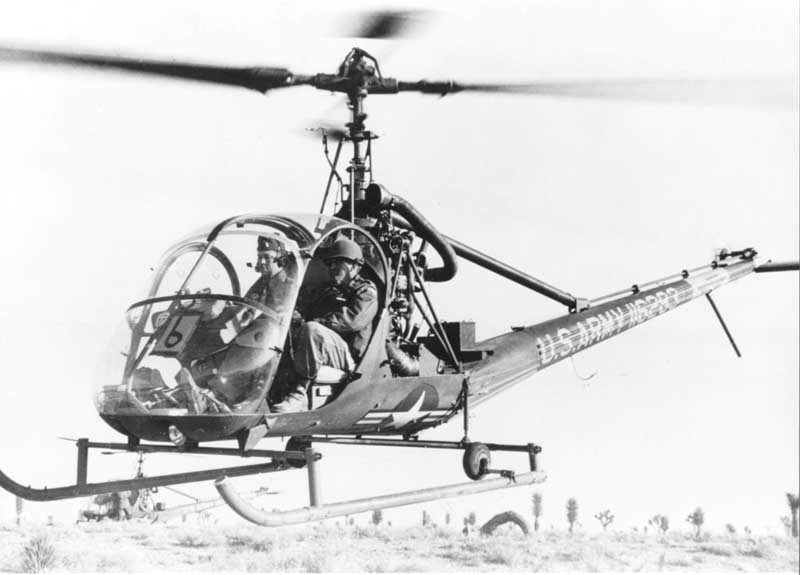
U.S. Army H-23B Raven

=== Military ===
YH-23
One Model UH-12A, modified with two-seat cabin and 178 hp Franklin engine for U.S. Army evaluation.
H-23A
Initial production version with 178 hp (133 kW) Franklin O-335-4 piston engine and two-seat cockpit, 100 built for the U.S. Army and 5 for evaluation by the U.S. Air Force.
H-23B
H-23A with skid/wheel undercarriage and 200 hp (149 kW) O-335-6 engine (some later re-engined with a 250 hp VO-435-23B), re-designated OH-23B in 1962, 273 built for the U.S. Army and 81 for military export.
H-23C
Model UH-12C with three-seat cabin, one-piece canopy and metal rotor blades, 145 built for the U.S. Army. Re-designated OH-23C in 1962.
H-23D
H-23C with new rotor, transmission and 250 hp (187 kW) Lycoming VO-435-23B engine, 348 built for U.S. Army. Re-designated OH-23D in 1962.
H-23E
Model UH-12E, not bought
H-23F
Model UH-12E-4, four-seat model with 25-inch cabin extension and a 305 hp VO-540-A1B engine, redesignated OH-23F in 1962, 22 built for U.S. Army.
H-23G
Three-seat dual control version of H-23F, redesignated OH-23G in 1962, 793 built.
HTE-1
U.S. Navy version of the Model UH-12A with Franklin O-335 engine, two-seater with dual controls, and wheeled tricycle undercarriage, 17 built.
HTE-2
U.S. Navy version of H-23B with Franklin O-335-6 engine, 35 built.
Hiller HT Mk 1
Royal Navy designation for 20 former U.S. Navy HTE-2s.
Hiller HT Mk 2
UH-12Es for Royal Navy. 21 supplied.
CH-112 Nomad
Canadian military designation for the UH-12Es.
H.2
(Thai: ฮ.๒) Royal Thai Armed Forces designation for the UH-12.
H.2A
(Thai: ฮ.๒ก) Royal Thai Armed Forces designation for the UH-12B.

=== Civilian ===
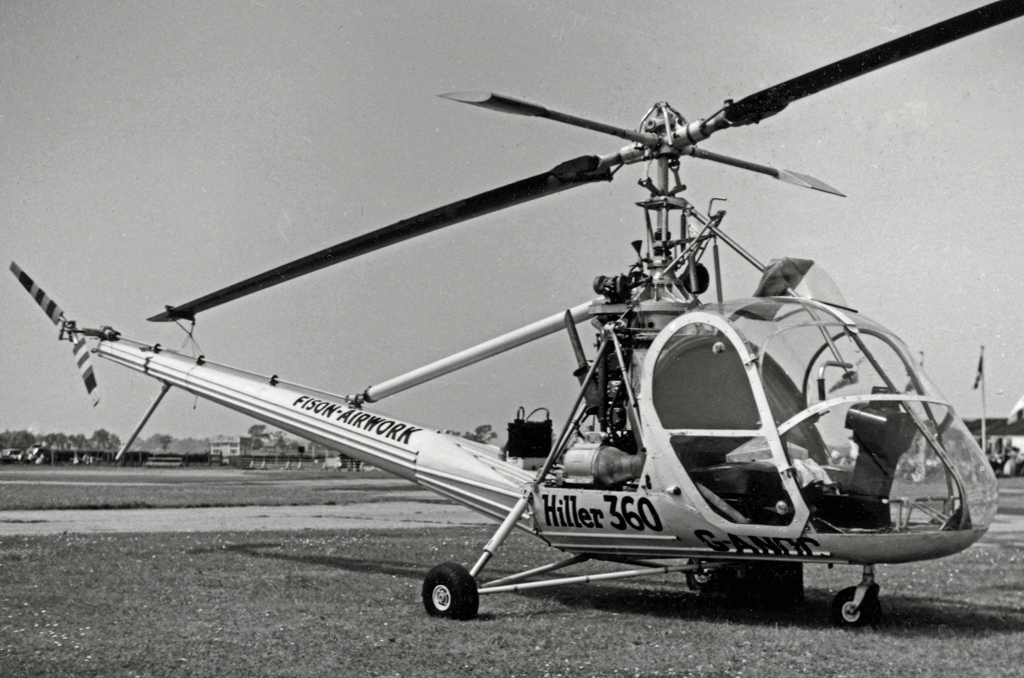
Hiller UH-12A (Hiller 360) in 1955 when used as a crop spraying demonstrator in England

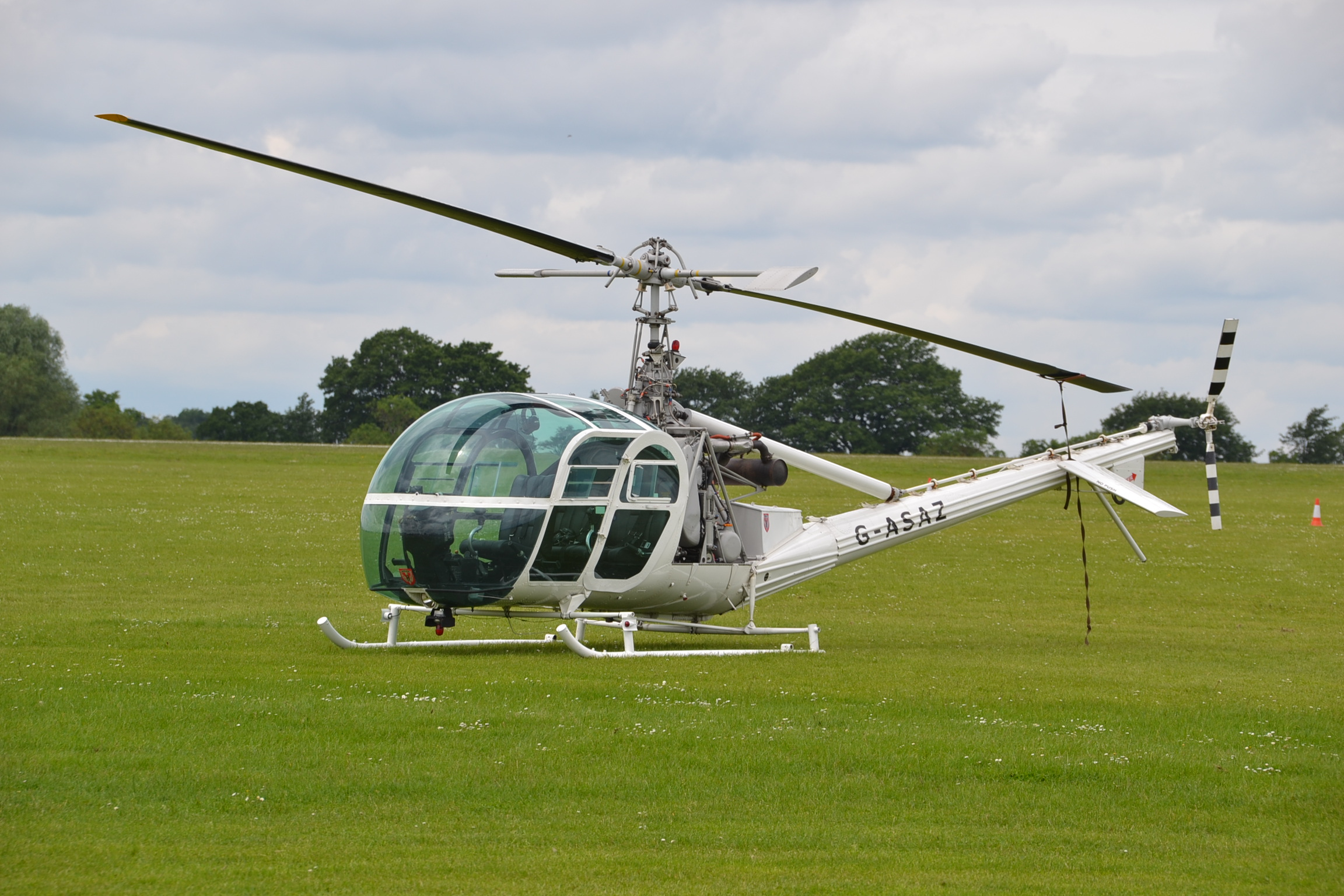
A civilian UH-12 at Heli UK Expo, 2014

UH-12A
Original production model for the U.S. Army, powered by a six cylinder fan-cooled Franklin 6V4-178-B33 engine with a maximal power of 178hp at 3000 rpm. The main rotor blades (produced by the Parsons Industries Inc.) are of solid wood laminations. The body of the blade is in fact essentially made up of numerous strip and block wooden laminations designed to provide a strong but highly flexible blade. The entire blade surface is covered with fiberglass cloth with the leading edge covered with an additional stainless steel sheet. The tail rotor is of all metal construction.
UH-12B (HTE-2)
Training version for the U.S. Navy. U.S. Navy designation HTE-2 prior to 1962.
UH-12C
Three-seat version, equipped with wood rotor blades and one-piece 'goldfish bowl' canopy. U.S. Army designation H-23C.
UH-12D
Improved version of the H-23C for the U.S. Army. U.S. Army designation H-23D.
UH-12E
Three-seat dual-control version of the H-23D.
UH-12ET
Turbine-powered version of the UH-12E, fitted with an Allison 250 turboshaft engine.
UH-12E-3
New three-seat production version.
UH-12E-3T
New turbine-powered production version.

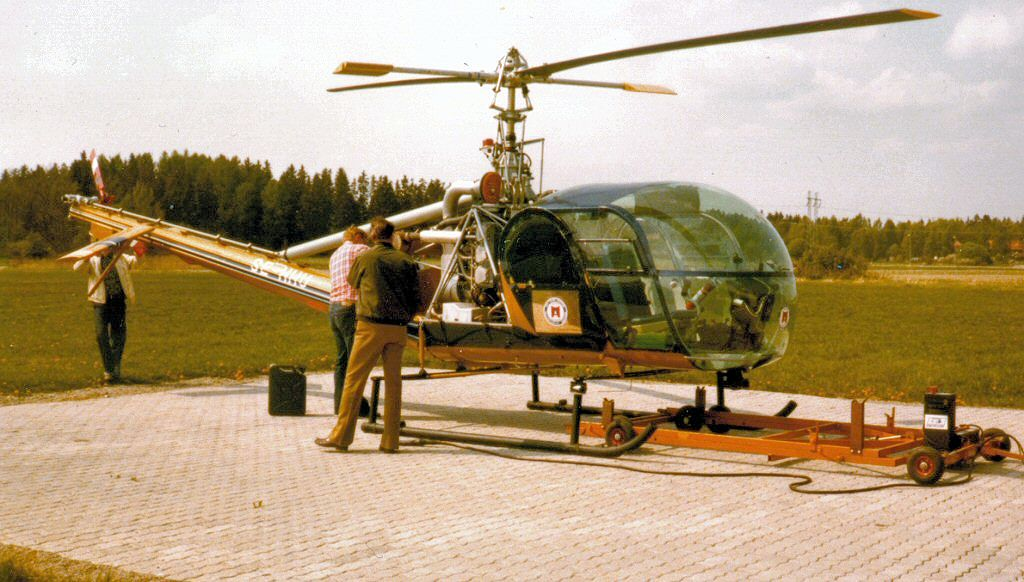
Hiller UH-12E-4, four seater

UH-12E-4
Four-seat civilian version (pilot in front, with back seat for three passengers). United States Army designation H-23F. VO-540 powered. Conversion kit available for E-12 models.
UH-12E-4T
Four-seat turbine-powered production version.
UH-12L-4
Lengthened version with wider cabin windows.

== Operators ==
Argentina

- Argentine Army Aviation
- Buenos Aires Provincial Police

Bolivia

- Bolivian Air Force

Canada

- Canadian Army

Chile

- Chilean Air Force

Colombia

- Colombian Air Force

Dominican Republic

- Dominican Air Force

France

- French Air Force

West Germany

- Bundesgrenzschutz

Guatemala

- Guatemalan Air Force

Indonesia

- Indonesian Air Force

Israel

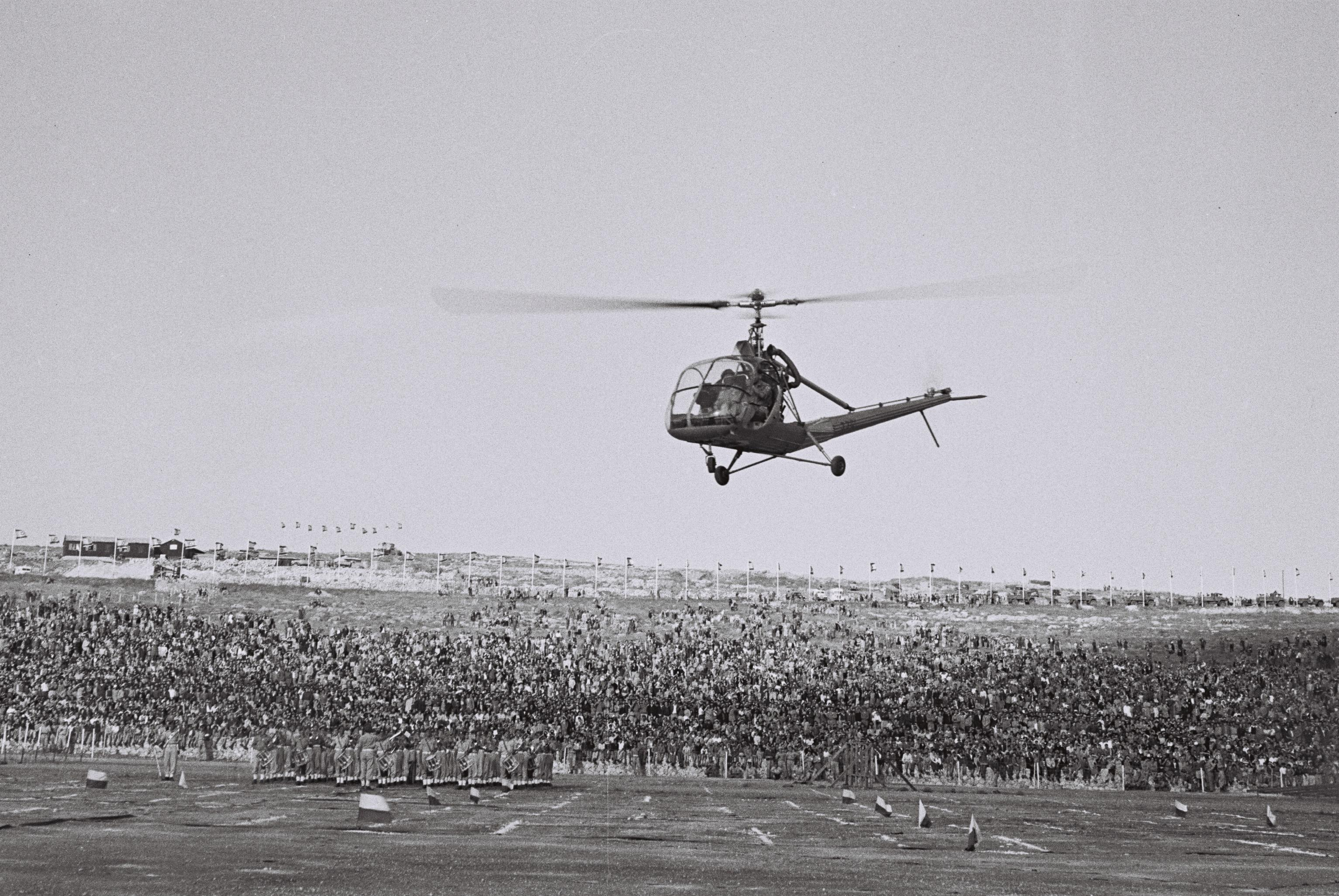
Israeli Air Force H-23A (model UH-12A), Jerusalem 1952

- Israeli Air Force

Mexico

- Mexican Air Force

Netherlands

- Royal Netherlands Air Force

Pakistan

- Government of Pakistan

Paraguay

- Paraguayan Air Force

Peru

- Peruvian Air Force

South Korea

- Republic of Korea Army

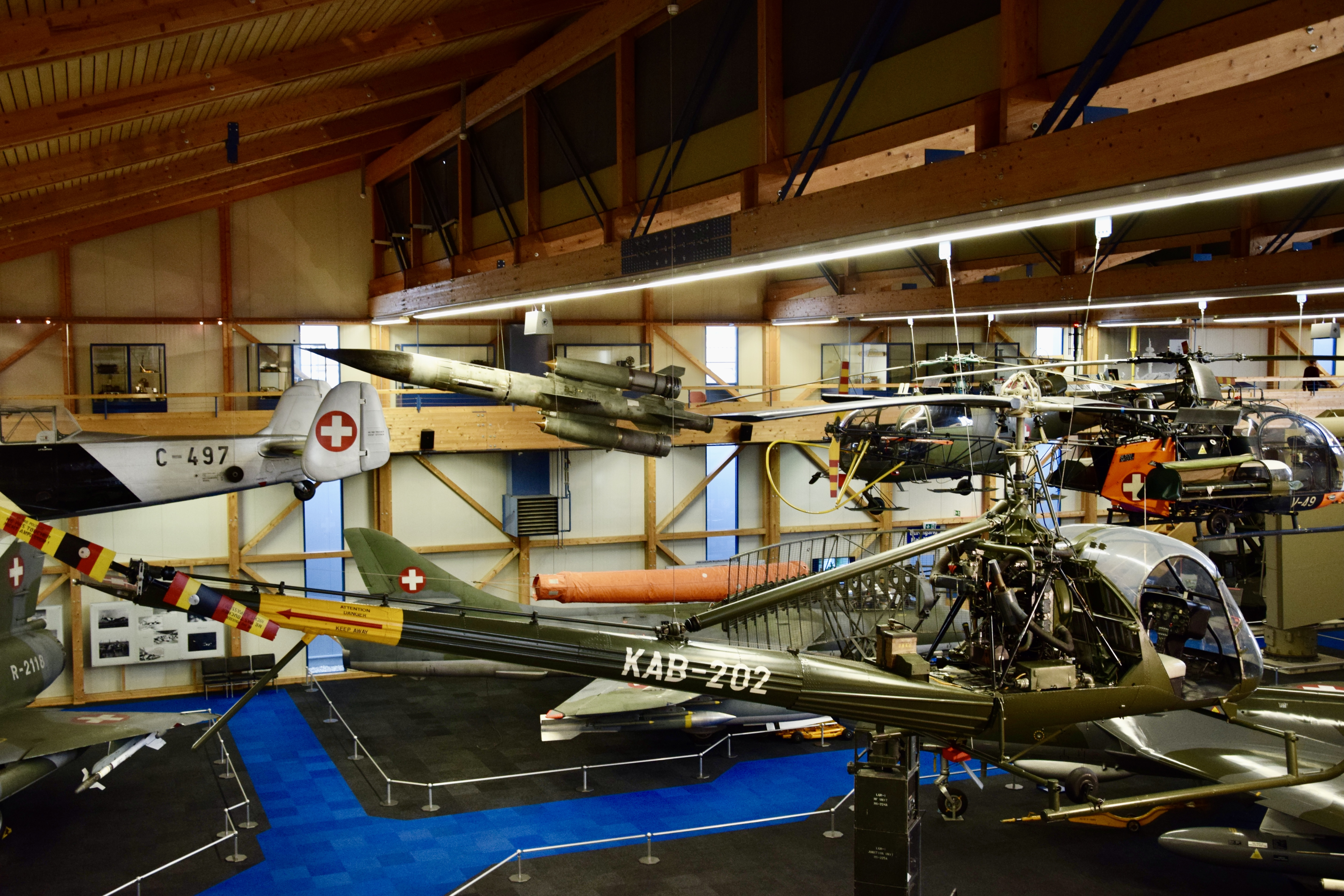
UH-12B at the Swiss Air Force Museum Dübendorf

Switzerland

- UH-12B

Thailand

- Royal Thai Police

United Kingdom

- Bristow Helicopters
- Royal Navy

United States

- Columbia Helicopters
- United States Army
- United States Navy

Uruguay

- Uruguayan Air Force

== Specifications (H-23D) ==
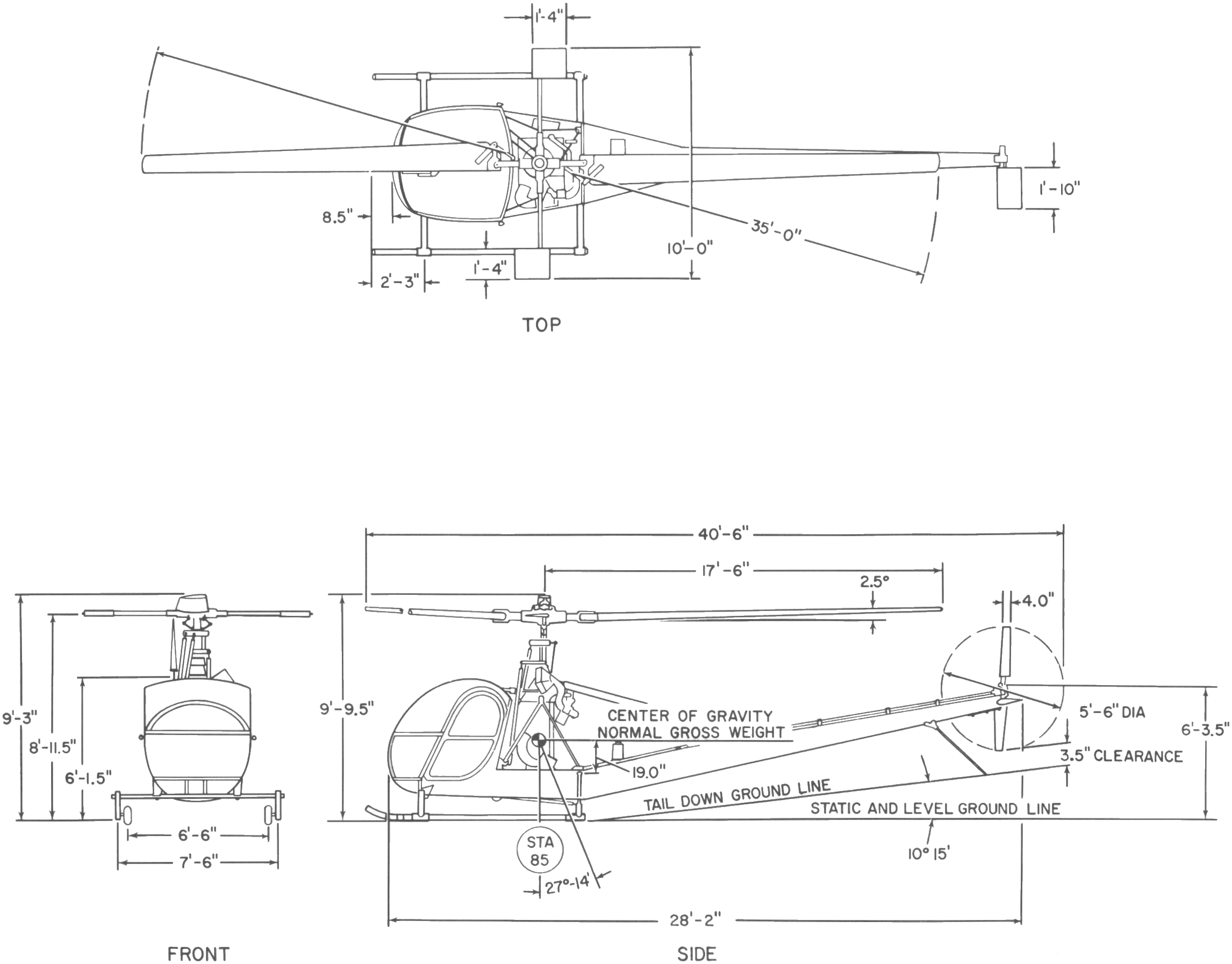
3-view line drawing of the Hiller H-23 Raven

Data from United States Military Aircraft since 1909

General characteristics

- Crew: 2
- Height: 9 ft 9.5 in (2.985 m)
- Empty weight: 1,816 lb (824 kg)
- Max takeoff weight: 2,700 lb (1,225 kg)
- Powerplant: 1 × Lycoming VO-435-23B 6-cylinder air-cooled horizontally-opposed piston engine, 250 hp (190 kW)
- Main rotor diameter: 35 ft 5 in (10.80 m)
- Main rotor area: 985 sq ft (91.5 m^{2})
- Blade section: NACA 0012

Performance

- Maximum speed: 95 mph (153 km/h, 83 kn)
- Cruise speed: 82 mph (132 km/h, 71 kn)
- Range: 197 mi (317 km, 171 nmi)
- Service ceiling: 13,200 ft (4,000 m)
- Rate of climb: 1,050 ft/min (5.3 m/s)

== See also ==
Related development

- Fairchild Hiller FH-1100

Aircraft of comparable role, configuration, and era

- Bell 47
- Schweizer (Hughes) 300
- Sikorsky S-52

Related lists

- List of military aircraft of the United States
- List of most produced rotorcraft

== Bibliography ==
- Bridgman, Leonard. Jane's All the World's Aircraft 1953–54. London: Sampson Low, Marston & Co. Ltd, 1953.
- Elliot, Bryn (March–April 1997). "Bears in the Air: The US Air Police Perspective". Air Enthusiast. No. 68. pp. 46–51. ISSN 0143-5450.
- Harding, Stephen. U.S. Army Aircraft since 1947. Shrewsbury, UK: Airlife, 1990. ISBN 978-1-85310-102-1
- "Pentagon Over the Islands: The Thirty-Year History of Indonesian Military Aviation". Air Enthusiast Quarterly (2): 154–162. n.d. ISSN 0143-5450.
- Spenser, Jay. Vertical Challenge: The Hiller Aircraft Story. AuthorHouse. 2003. ISBN 978-0-7596-3398-8
- Swanborough, F.G. and Bowers, Peter M. United States Military Aircraft since 1909. London: Putnam, 1963.
- Swanborough, Gordon and Bowers, Peter M. United States Navy Aircraft since 1911 (second edition). London: Putnam, 1976. ISBN 978-0-370-10054-8]
- Thetford, Owen. British Naval Aircraft since 1912 (fourth edition). London: Putnam, 1978. ISBN 978-0-370-30021-4
- Vetter, Frank (2005). "Debrief: German Border Police 50th anniversary". International Air Power Review. Vol. 17. pp. 20–21. ISSN 1473-9917.
- OH-23 Factsheet
