= Philip Frederick Hiller =

German parson and hymnwriter (1699–1769)

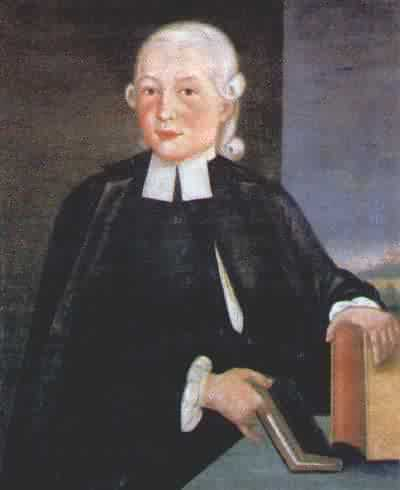
Portrait of Hiller

Philip Frederick Hiller (German: Philipp Friedrich Hiller; 1699–1769) was one of the most prolific hymn writers of the Evangelical Church of Southern Germany.

== Life ==
Philip Frederick Hiller was born on 6 January 1699 at Mühlhausen an der Enz, where his father, Johann Jacob Hiller, was a preacher. He was educated under Johann Albrecht Bengel. He became pastor at two or three little villages, and finally at Steinheim in 1732. He lost his voice in 1751, and died in 1769.

== Works ==
After his retirement from the pulpit he devoted himself especially to sacred poetry, and produced over 1000 hymns, many of which became popular. It was said that, next to the Bible, his spiritual songs were perhaps the most widely circulated book in Württemberg for many years. A complete edition appeared at Reutlingen in 1844 and 1851.

== Sources ==
- Bautz, Wilhelm (1990). "Hiller, Philipp Friedrich". In Biographisch-Bibliographisches Kirchenlexikon (BBKL). Vol. 2. Hamm: Bautz. ISBN 3-88309-032-8. pp. 864–867.
- Bertheau, Carl (1880). "Hiller, Philipp Friedrich". In Allgemeine Deutsche Biographie (ADB). Vol. 12. Leipzig: Duncker & Humblot. pp. 425–426.
- Julian, John (1907). "Hiller, Philipp Friederich". In A Dictionary of Hymnology. Vol. 1. 2nd ed. New York: Dover Publications, Inc. pp. 524–525.
- Scheffler, Walter P. H. (1972). "Hiller, Philipp Friedrich". In Neue Deutsche Biographie (NDB). Vol. 9. Berlin: Duncker & Humblot. ISBN 3-428-00190-7. pp. 151–152.
- Winkworth, Catherine (1869). Christian Singers of Germany. Philadelphia: J. B. Lippincott & Co.; Macmillan & Co. pp. 237, 278–284.

Attribution:

- McClintock, John; Strong, James, eds. (1872). "Hiller, Philip Frederick". In Cyclopædia of Biblical, Theological and Ecclesiastical Literature. Vol. 4. New York: Harper & Brothers. p. 258.
