= Hiller Aircraft =

American aerospace company

Hiller Aircraft Corporation
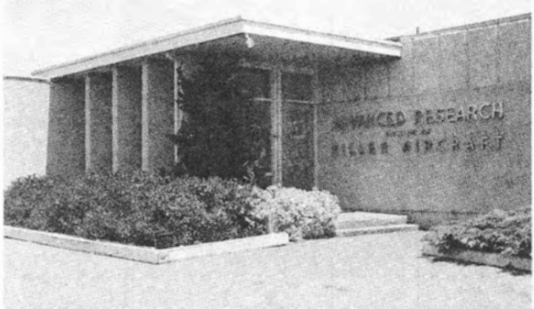
- Lockheed's Covert "Advanced Projects" Facility at Hiller Aircraft (Menlo Park, CA)
- Industry: Aerospace
- Founded: 1942
- Founders: Stanley Hiller
- Headquarters: Firebaugh, California

Hiller Aircraft Corporation is an American private aerospace company, based in Firebaugh, California. It was founded in 1942 as Hiller Industries by Stanley Hiller to develop helicopters, and was purchased in 1964 by Fairchild Aircraft. An independent company again since 1994, Hiller filed for Chapter 11 bankruptcy protection on November 21st, 2024.

== History ==
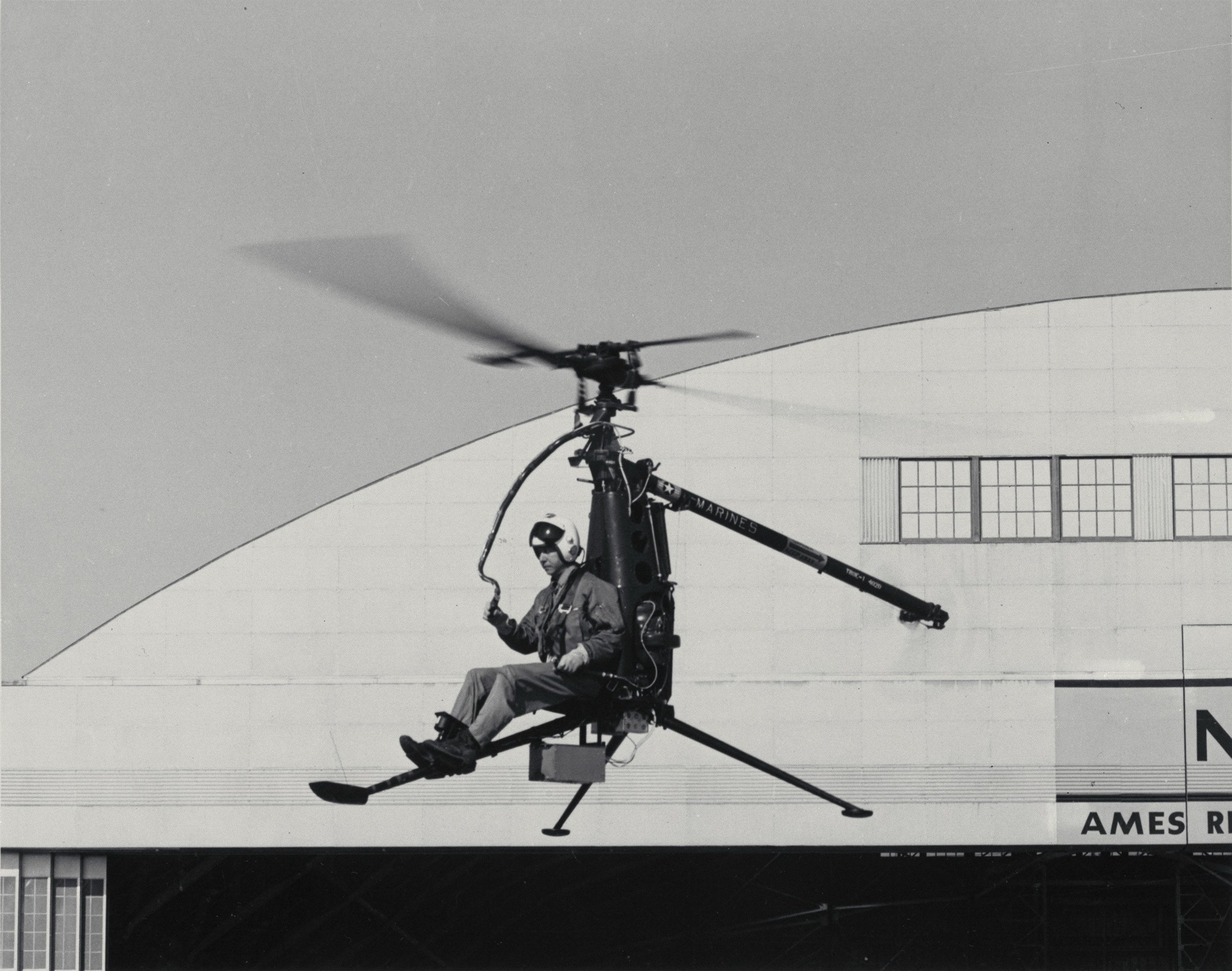
1956 Hiller YROE-1 one-man "Rotorcycle" being tested at NASA Ames Research Center

Stanley Hiller, then seventeen, established the first helicopter factory on the West Coast of the United States, located in Berkeley, California, in 1942, under the name "Hiller Industries," to develop his design for the coaxial-rotor XH-44 "Hiller-Copter" for the U.S. Army. The XH-44 became operational in 1944. In collaboration with Henry J. Kaiser, it became United Helicopters in 1945. In the postwar years, United Helicopter produced a number of innovative helicopter designs for military and civilian purposes, including coaxial-rotor and tailless designs, as well as more conventional models. In January, 1949, a Hiller 360 became the first civilian helicopter to cross the United States.

Besides helicopters, in the year after World War II, Stanley Hiller researched a two-man rocket-jet aircraft design that took off and landed vertically, called the VJ-100, in which he tried unsuccessfully to interest the U.S. military.

The company was renamed Hiller Helicopters in 1948. It was involved in the development of a number of prototype helicopters. From the early 1960s to 1969, its Palo Alto plant served as a CIA cover for the production of the CORONA reconnaissance satellites.

Hiller was purchased by Fairchild Aircraft in 1964.

Jeff Hiller, the son of Stanley Hiller, repurchased the company in 1994 with the help of a dozen Thai investors led by Patrick C. Lim, part owner of Siam Steel and many other Asian ventures. For ownership of Hiller aircraft, these investors helped cover the company's liabilities about $1 million and commit about $10 million to build at least 30 new helicopters at the new East Bay production site and also setting up the first aerospace company in Thailand.

Stanley Hiller donated money and a number of aircraft to form the Hiller Aviation Museum in San Carlos, California, which opened in 1998.

In 2009, the Hiller (China) Aircraft Manufacturing Company began construction of a production facility in Zhangjiakou City, northwest of Beijing. The company is a joint venture between Hiller Aircraft Corporation, Zhangjiakou Chahar General Aviation Company. At the time, Zhangjiakou Chahar General Aviation was already carrying out low-rate production of UH-12 parts and sub assemblies.

In July 2018 an accident in which a truck driver drove over his co-driver occurred at the Hiller Firebaugh facility. On May 4 a jury found Hiller 70% at fault for the accident and awarded the injured driver over 9 million dollars in damages. Prior to filing for bankruptcy protection in 2024, the company's website news update from February 15, 2021, indicated the company was struggling financially, with the owners hesitating to provide further funding to keep the company operating.

== Aircraft ==
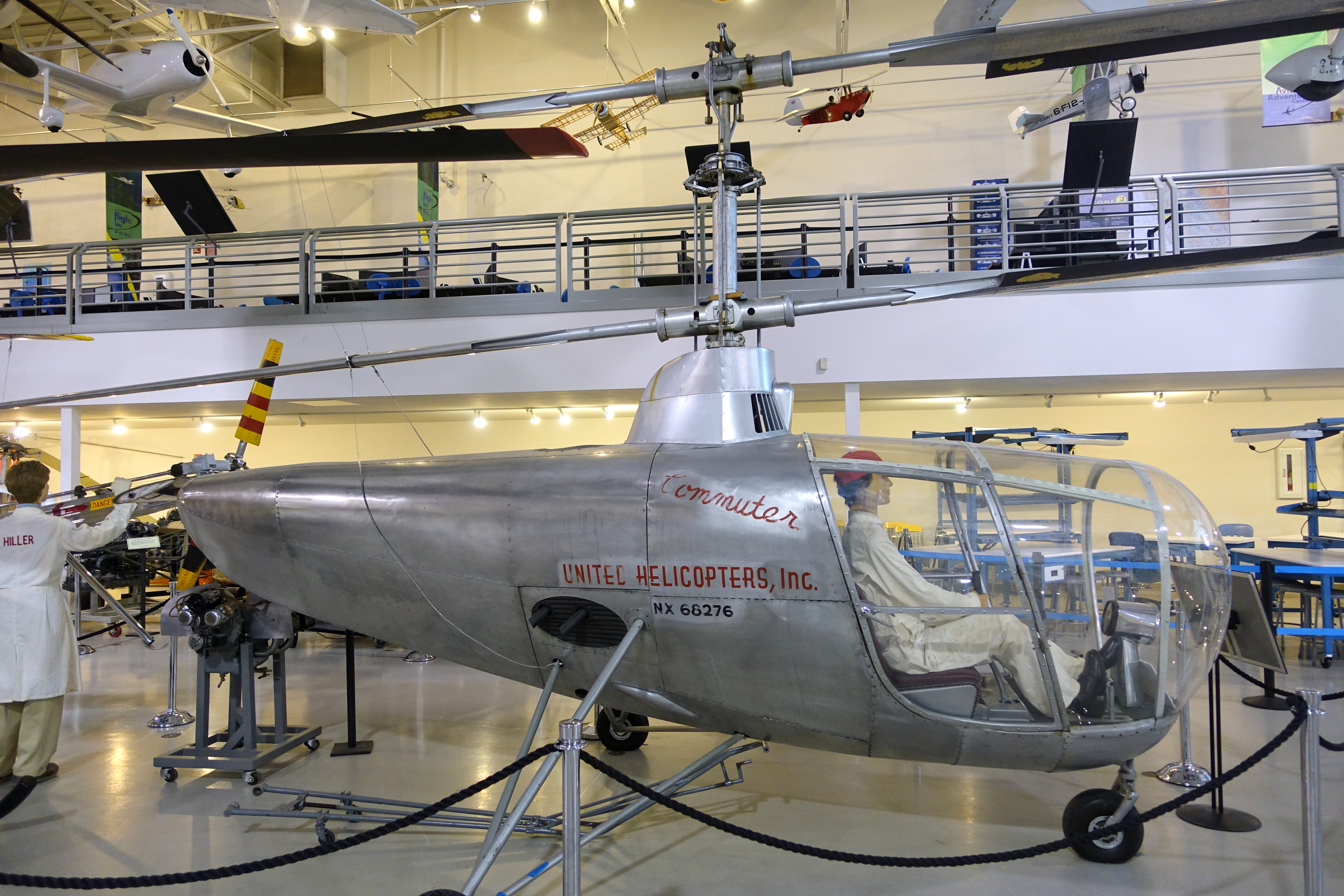
Hiller UH-4 Commuter

Model name	First flight	Number built	Type
Hiller XH-44	1944	1	
Hiller VJ-100			
Hiller 1094 CAMEL			An experimental, ultralight collapsible helicopter developed as a single-seat aircraft for tactical armed forces use, the name CAMEL served as an acronym for Collapsible Airborne Military Equipment Lifter
Hiller Autogyro			
Hiller Transonic VTOL			
Hiller Ductoplane			
Hiller X-2-235			
Hiller J-5			
Hiller UH-4 Commuter			
Hiller UH-5 Rotormatic			
Hiller UH-12	1948	2000 +	Single piston-engine observation helicopter
Hiller HH-120 Hornet			
Hiller HJ-1			
Hiller VXT-8	N/A		Coleopter
Hiller YH-32 Hornet	1950	18	Tip Ramjet engine helicopter
Hiller VZ-1 Pawnee	1955	6	"Flying platform"
Hiller 1098 STORC			Tip turbojet convertible plane/helicopter
Hiller 1123			Tip turbojet cargo helicopter designed for US Army's Transportation Research and Engineering Command (TRECOM)
Hiller Air Tug			Tip turbojet super heavy lift helicopter for mid air Saturn S-IC Booster recovery
Hiller ROE-1 Rotorcycle	1956	12	Ultralight piston-engine helicopter
Hiller X-18	1959	1	Experimental twin engine tiltwing
Hiller Ten99	1961	1	Single turbine engine helicopter
Fairchild Hiller FH-1100	1963	253	Single turbine engine helicopter
Fairchild Hiller FH-227	1966	78	Twin-engine turboprop commercial airliner
