= Ulrike Hiller =

German politician from the Social Democratic Party of Germany

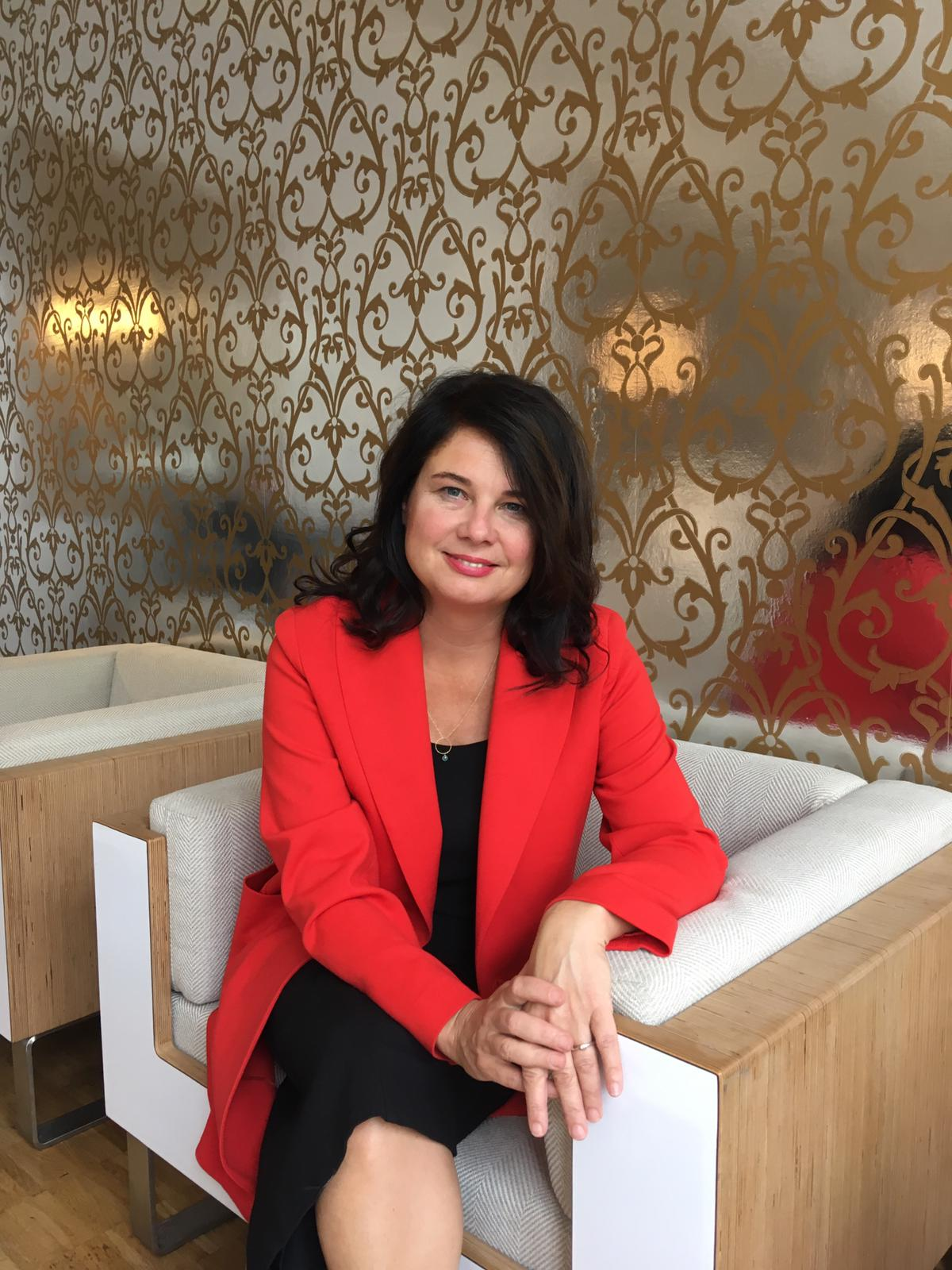
- Ulrike Hiller in 2018

Member of the Bremen Parliament
- In office 2007–2012

Personal details
- Born: 11 June 1965 (age 61) Sarstedt, West Germany
- Party: SPD

Ulrike Hiller (born 11 June 1965) is a German politician from the Social Democratic Party of Germany (SPD). She was a member of the Bremen Parliament from 2007 to 2012. From December 2012 to August 2019, she was the representative of the Free Hanseatic City of Bremen to the federal government and for Europe as a Bremen State Councillor. In September 2021, Hiller was elected to the supervisory board of SV Werder Bremen.

== Biography ==
=== Education and career ===
Hiller obtained an intermediate school leaving certificate. From 1982 to 1986 she trained as a kindergarten teacher at the Birkenhof technical college in Hanover and obtained her university entrance qualification. From 1987 to 1992 she studied social education at the University of Bremen and graduated with a diploma as a social worker / social education worker. From 1995 to 2003 she studied law with a focus on labour law at the University of Bremen, which she completed with the first state examination. In addition to her studies, she completed part-time further training in public relations and press work at the Remscheid Academy in 1995/96 and trained as a mediator with a focus on the business and working world in Hamburg in 1998/99.

From 1992 to 1995 Hiller worked at the unemployment center of the Evangelical Church of Bremen. From 1985 to 1986 she worked in youth welfare in Sarstedt and from 1986 to 1987 she was an au pair in Paris. During her studies she held various positions in the field of pedagogy and youth education at the German-French Youth Office, Work and Life, the Protestant Church and the City of Bremen and in 1991/92 at the Haus der Familie in Bremen-Mitte and from 1992 to 1995 at the Tenever unemployment center of the Protestant Church in Bremen . From 1995 to 2006 she was the municipal women's officer and later equal opportunities officer for the municipality of Ottersberg . In accordance with the provisions of the Members of Parliament Act, her employment relationship was suspended for the duration of her membership in the city council until 2012. From 2003 she also worked as a freelance mediator, coach and moderator . From December 2012 to August 2019, she was the representative of the Free Hanseatic City of Bremen to the federal government, for Europe and development cooperation - until 2014 also for the area of integration. Since 2017, she has been chair of the German delegation to the Committee of the Regions, Brussels. She was Ambassador of the Red Cross in Bremen and since June 2019 on the board of the European Movement Germany.

Hiller was the first woman to be elected to the supervisory board of SV Werder Bremen in September 2021 and became vice chairwoman of the supervisory board. There she is committed to ensuring that more women take on responsibility. She was a mediator with a focus on conflict management in business and work at Brückenschlag in Hamburg and a certified media consultant at the Remscheid Academy.

Hiller was married to Bremen Mayor Andreas Bovenschulte and has two children from this marriage. In July 2021, both announced their separation.

=== Political career ===
Hiller has been a member of the ÖTV trade union since 1982 and ver.di since 2001. She became a member of the SPD in 1998. From 1999 to 2003 she was spokesperson for the advisory board in Bremen-Mitte and from 2003 to 2007 spokesperson for the SPD parliamentary group there. From 2006 to 2012 she was chairwoman of the SPD local association in Bremen-Altstadt.

From 2007 until her appointment as State Councillor in December 2012, Hiller was a member of the Bremen Parliament. There she was represented in the Committee for Integration, Federal and European Affairs, International Contacts and Development Cooperation, the Legal Committee, the Constitutional and Rules Committee, the Executive Board of the Bremen Parliament and the Election Scrutiny Court. She was the spokesperson for the SPD parliamentary group for the policy areas of federal and European affairs.

From December 2012 to August 2019, Hiller was appointed State Councillor and Federal Representative for European Affairs and Integration Affairs under Mayor Jens Böhrnsen (SPD) in the Senate under Mayor Jens Böhrnsen (SPD) as the successor to Eva Quante-Brandt (Senate Böhrnsen III). In this role, she was a member of the Bundesrat from 13 December 2012 to 15 August 2019. From 1 July 2013, Hiller was Chair of the Conference of European Ministers (EMK) for one year. She continued in the Sieling senate. She was succeeded in August 2019 by State Councillor Olaf Joachim (SPD).

In the 2025 German federal election, Hiller ran as a direct candidate in the Bremen I federal constituency and as number 1 on the state list. She was elected on the first vote; but she got no mandate for the Bundestag because her district became vacant.

== Writings ==
- Politics is feminine: as a woman in the centers of power in Brussels, Berlin, Bremen. Kellner Verlag, Bremen 2023, ISBN 978-3-95651-420-3.
