= Heinrich Hiller (artist) =

German painter (1846–1912)

Heinrich Hiller (born 1846 in Berlin; died 1912 in Berlin) was a German landscape and marine painter of the 19th century.

== Life ==
Hiller showed his works from 1866 to 1883 in the Berlin Academy of Arts exhibitions, in 1880 in the Dresden Art Academy, in 1882 in the Hanover Art Exhibition and in 1894 in the Lübeck Art Exhibition. His early works were mainly painted in Germany. He probably undertook a study trip to England between 1874 and 1878, since in 1878 he exhibited, among other paintings, views of The Needles off the Isle of Wight England and the port of Dublin, in Berlin. Other of his works were created in Prague, Świnoujście, Ostend, Elsinore, Rotterdam, Prague, Venice or Rome. After his death, some of the paintings were auctioned, including The Market Place in Amalfi and View of Kronborg Castle near Helsingør.

== Works (selection) ==
- Castle Beilstein on the Moselle
- Westphalian Landscape 1866
- Prague: Market Day on the Old Town Square c.1870
- Near Achenkirchen, Rain and Sunshine 1872
- Rheinifer near Koblenz 1874
- Winter landscape near Blankenburg in the Mark 1880
- Beach near Swinemünde 1881.
- The Old Love near Cuxhaven 1882
- The Pantheon in Rome
- Kronborg Castle 1882 (Hanover)
- Wyk Island and On the Baltic Sea 1891
- View of the Gulf of Naples with Vesuvius in the background 1891
- Venice: St. Mark's Square
- Village green - Dorfplatz
- Winter's day - Wintertag
