= Yakovlev EG =

Yakovlev EG / Sh / Yak-M11FR-1

General information
- Type: Experimental helicopter
- Manufacturer: Yakovlev
- Number built: 1

History
- First flight: 1947

The Yakovlev EG (Eksperimentalnyi Gelikopter), also commonly known as the Yak-M11FR-1 and Sh (Shootka), was an experimental helicopter with coaxial rotors. The prototype was first flown by V.V. Tezavrovsky in December 1947.

== Design and development ==
The fuselage of the EG was a welded steel tube truss with duralumin skinning on the fwd fuselage back to the rear of the engine compartment. The rear fuselage was fabric covered and supported a tailplane-style unit with twin endplate fins, as well as a tailskid. The Pilot and Passenger sat side by side under a glazed canopy with a car-style door on each side.

The M-11FR engine was mounted behind the gearbox which it drove via a short shaft. The gearbox supported the Rotor pylon which had two, contra-rotating, co-axial, two-bladed rotors. A fixed tricycle undercarriage mounted on steel tube trusses supported the helicopter on the ground.

Flight testing revealed vibration at forward speeds above 20–30 km/h (12–19 mph; 11–16 kn) In an effort to reduce vibration the tailplane and fins were removed.

In early 1948 the M-11FR engine was replaced by a 190 hp (140 kW) M-12, which proved troublesome so an M-11FR was refitted to complete the flight trials by 8 July 1948.

== Specifications ==
Data from OKB Yakovlev, Yakovlev aircraft since 1924

General characteristics

- Crew: 2
- Capacity: 142 kg (313 lb) payload
- Length: 6.53 m (21 ft 5 in) fuselage
- Empty weight: 878 kg (1,936 lb)
- Gross weight: 1,020 kg (2,249 lb)
- Fuel capacity: 50 kg (110 lb) fuel
- Powerplant: 1 × Shvetsov M-11FR-1 5-cylinder air-cooled radial piston engine, 100 kW (140 hp)
- Main rotor diameter: 2 × 10 m (32 ft 10 in)
- Main rotor area: 157.1 m^{2} (1,691 sq ft) co-axial rotors

Performance

- Maximum speed: 150 km/h (93 mph, 81 kn) at sea level (design)
- Range: 235 km (146 mi, 127 nmi)
- Service ceiling: 2,700 m (8,900 ft) (design)
- Hover ceiling: 250 m (820 ft)
- Rate of climb: 3.1 m/s (610 ft/min)

== See also ==
Related development

- Yakovlev Yak-100
- Mil Mi-1
