= Arthur Hiller (footballer) =

German footballer (1881–1941)

Personal information
- Date of birth: 3 October 1881
- Place of birth: Pforzheim, Germany
- Date of death: 14 August 1941 (aged 59)
- Place of death: Pforzheim, Germany
- Position: Midfielder

Senior career*
Years	Team	Apps	(Gls)
1899–1914	1. FC Pforzheim		

International career
1908–1909	German Empire	4	(0)
- * Club domestic league appearances and goals

Arthur Hiller (3 October 1881 – 14 August 1941) was a German footballer who played club football for 1. FC Pforzheim, as well as at international level for Germany, where he became the national side's first captain. His nephew, Marius Hiller, also played football, representing both Germany and Argentina at international level.
