= Volker Redder =

German politician

Volker Redder (born 7 June 1959) is a German politician for the FDP and since 2021 a member of the Bundestag, the federal diet.

== Politics ==
Redder was born 1959 in the federal city state of Bremen and studied biology and computer science. Redder also holds a PhD degree from the University of Bremen in computer science. He founded twelve companies.

Redder was a member of two committees of the Bremian state diet from 2015 to 2021 without being a member of the diet. In Bremen some committees are called "Deputationen" and regular citizens can be a member of them if they are appointed by their respective parliament group. Since 2021 he is member of the Bundestag.
