= Matthias Hiller (theologian) =

German theologian and philologist (1646–1725)

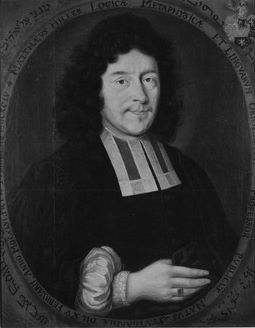
Portrait of Hiller in the collection of the University of Tübingen

Matthias Hiller (15 February 1646 – 11 February 1725) was a German Protestant theologian and Orientalist.

== Life ==
Matthias Hiller was born at Stuttgart on 15 February 1646, the son of a Württemberg government secretary. He became professor of logic and metaphysics in 1692, and of Oriental languages and theology in 1698. In 1716 he exchanged these offices for the priory of Königsbronn, where he died on 11 February 1725.

== Works ==
Hiller acquired great reputation by his works on philology and hermeneutics. He wrote:

- Sciagraphia Grammaticae Hebrae;
- Lexicon Latino-Hebraecum (1685);
- De Arcano Keri et Kethib (Tübingen, 1692, 8vo), on the accentuation and punctuation of the Bible;
- Institutiones Linguae Sanctae (several times reprinted, as Tübingen, 1760, 8vo);
- Onomasticon Sacrum (Tübingen, 1706, 4to, translated into German by himself);
- Syntagmata hermneneutica quibus loca S. Scripturae plurima ex Hebraico textu nove explicantur (Tübingen, 1711, 4to);
- Hieroqlyphicum;
- De Origine Gentium Celticarum;
- De Origine, diis et terra Palaestinorum;
- De Plantis in S. Scriptura memoratis;
- Hierophyticon (Utrecht, 1725, 4to).

== Sources ==
- Redslob, Gustav Moritz (1880). "Hiller, Matthäus". In Allgemeine Deutsche Biographie (ADB). Vol. 12. Leipzig: Duncker & Humblot. pp. 424–425.

Attribution:

- Proeschel, Jules N. (1872). "Hiller, Matthias". In McClintock, John; Strong, James (eds.). Cyclopædia of Biblical, Theological and Ecclesiastical Literature. Vol. 4.—H, I, J. New York: Harper & Brothers. p. 258.
