= Hiller Aviation Museum =

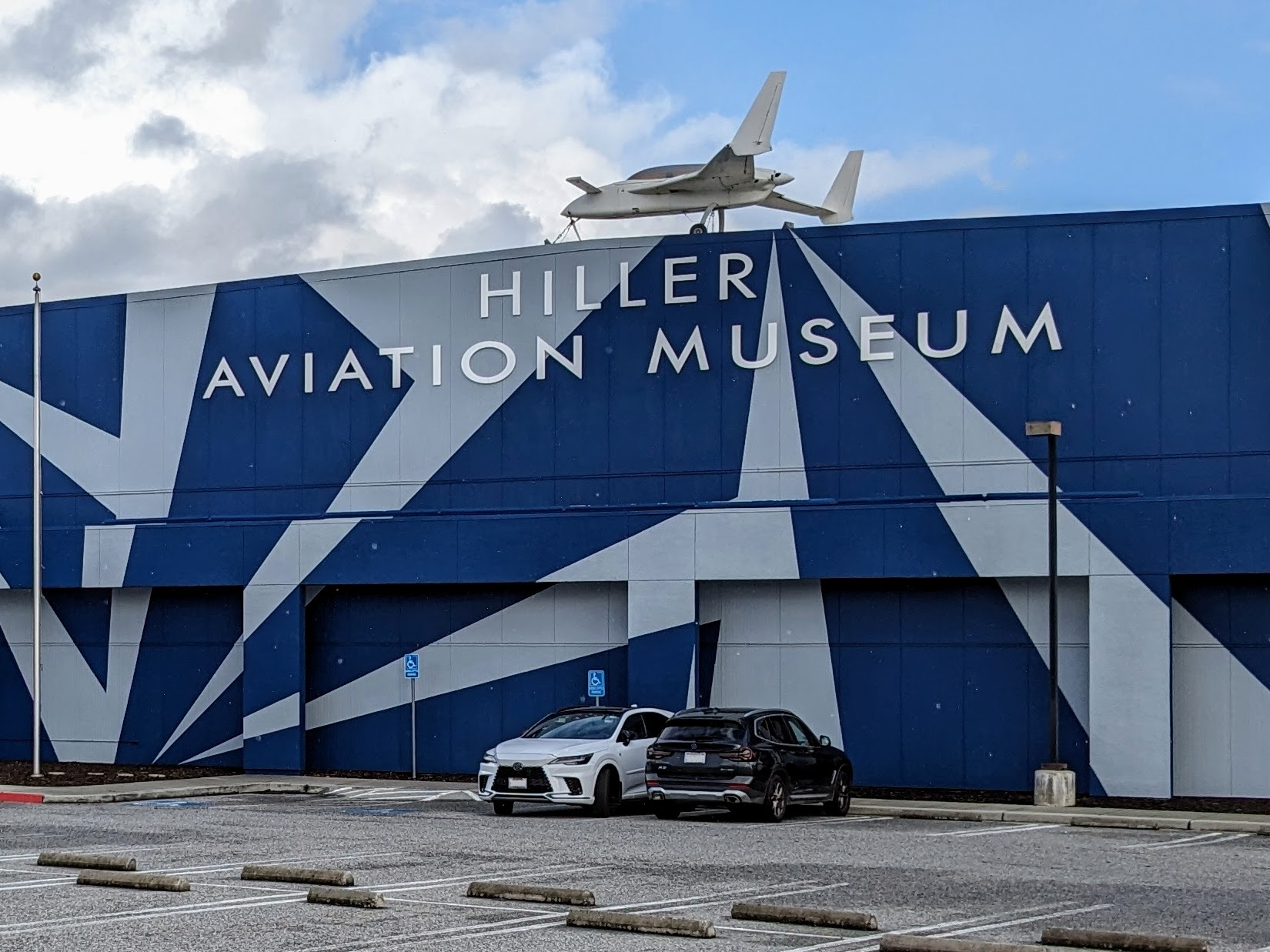
- The front of the Hiller Aviation Museum with a Rutan Long-EZ on the roof

- Location within California
- Established: June 1998
- Location: San Carlos, California
- Coordinates: 37.5124°N 122.2531°W
- Type: Aviation museum
- Collection size: 50+ aircraft
- Founder: Stanley Hiller Jr.
- President: Jon Welte
- Website: www.hiller.org

The Hiller Aviation Museum is an aviation museum located at the San Carlos Airport in San Carlos, California, focused on Northern California aviation history, Hiller Aircraft and helicopter history.

== History ==
=== Background ===
As early as the late 1960s, Stanley Hiller began collecting aircraft at a warehouse in Redwood City, California. By 1986, it displayed 15 aircraft and set a goal of a acquiring a total of 28 of Hiller's designs. Eight years later it had surpassed this and the Hiller Museum of Northern California Aviation Heritage included over 40 aircraft.

=== Move to San Carlos ===
However, public access was limited. So, funded by a trust established by Hiller, the museum announced a proposal to acquire a 13,000 sq ft (1,200 m^{2}) building at the San Carlos Airport and expand it to 44,000 sq ft (4,100 m^{2}) facility. A lease for the property was approved in March 1996 and ground was broken in October. The 53,000 sq ft (4,900 m^{2}) Hiller Aviation Museum opened on 5 June 1998.

The Boeing 2707 mockup, which had been on display at the museum since it opened, moved back to Seattle in 2013 where it is undergoing restoration at the Museum of Flight.

== Facilities ==
The Michael King Smith Research Library at the museum has a collection of approximately 5,400 books.

== Exhibits ==
Exhibits at the museum include flight simulators, a retired British Airways 747 to explore, and an indoor drone plex. There are also displays about early aviation, California pioneers, air racing, women in aviation, the mechanics of flight, urban air mobility and weather.

One of the museum's most popular attractions is the forward fuselage and flight deck of a retired British Airways Boeing 747-100, painted in Flying Tigers colors, open for public access via staircase.

== Collection ==
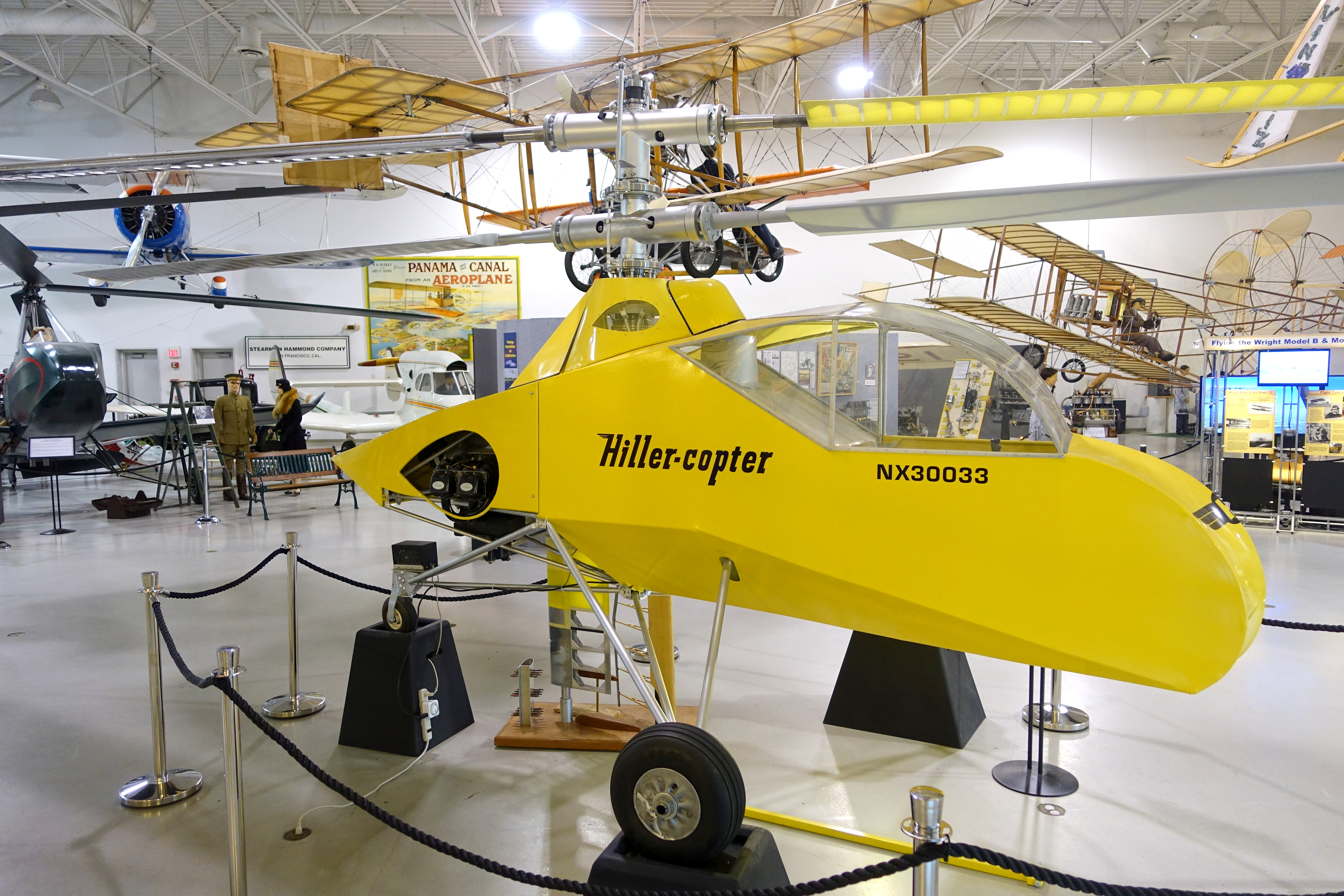
Hiller XH-44

=== Aircraft ===
- Aero Commander 500U
- Aero L-39 Albatros
- Airbus Vahana
- Arnold AR-5
- Beachey Little Looper – replica
- Bede BD-5T
- Bell 47D
- Boeing 737-200 – cockpit
- Boeing 747 – forward fuselage
- Boeing Condor
- Bright Star Swift
- Buhl A-1 Autogiro
- Cessna 177 Cardinal
- Colomban Cri-cri
- Curtiss Model D – replica
- Del Mar DH-20
- EAA Penguin
- Fairchild Hiller FH-1100
- Fokker Dr.I – replica
- General Atomics MQ-1 Predator
- Grumman HU-16(RD) Albatross
- Hiller 360
- Hiller Flying Platform
- Hiller VXT-8 – replica
- Hiller J-10
- Hiller OH-23B Raven
- Hiller UH-12A
- Hiller XH-44 – replica
- Hiller XROE-1 Rotorcycle
- Hiller YH-32 Hornet
- Hiller YH-32 Hornet
- Hollmann HA-2M Sportster
- Irvine Aerocycloid – replica
- Kitty Hawk Flyer
- Lockheed YO-3 Quiet Star
- Maupin-Lanteri Black Diamond
- Marriott Avitor – replica
- Montgomery Evergreen
- Montgomery Gull – replica
- Montgomery Santa Clara – replica
- NASA AD-1
- Opener BlackFly
- ParaPlane PM-1
- Pietenpol Air Camper
- Pitts S-1C
- Quicksilver MX
- RotorWay Scorpion
- Rutan Defiant
- Rutan Long-EZ
- SoloTrek XFV
- SpaceShipOne – replica
- Stearman-Hammond Y-1
- Thaden T-1 Argonaut – fuselage
- Travel Air D4D
- United Helicopters UH-4
- Velie Monocoupe Model 70
- Vin Fiz Flyer – replica
- Wisk Cora Gen5
- Wright Flyer – replica

=== Ground vehicles ===
- Baker electric automobile
- Messerschmitt KR200

=== Simulators ===
- Curtiss Wright P-2
- Del Mar DHT-2
- Link Trainer
- McDonnell Douglas A-4M Skyhawk cockpit simulator

== Events ==
The museum hosts the Biggest Little Air Show, an annual airshow consisting of radio-control model aircraft ending with a piloted aerobatic demonstration. It also holds an annual Airport Runway Run.

This museum sponsored Vertical Challenge, an annual all-helicopter airshow from 2000-2010, and a final one in 2012. In 2011 and 2016 an aviation festival event called Heli-Fest was held instead.

== Programs ==
This museum offers two Scouts BSA Merit Badge programs, the Aviation Merit Badge and the Weather Merit Badge.

== See also ==
- List of aerospace museums
