= Hiller CAMEL =

The Hiller Model 1094 CAMEL was an experimental, ultralight collapsible helicopter designed by Stanley Hiller and the Hiller Aircraft Corporation. Developed as a single-seat aircraft for tactical armed forces use, the name CAMEL served as an acronym for Collapsible Airborne Military Equipment Lifter.

Engineered to fold down into a highly compressed package, allowing it to be easily transported in a container or dropped by a larger supply plane. The aircraft was designed to transition from its packed state to fully assembled for flight in a matter of minutes by military personnel in the field. Evaluation and technical blueprints explored multiple configurations, including utilizing the compact Allison T63 turboshaft engine.

Developed alongside similar "rotorcycle" concepts, very few physical mockups or prototypes were built, though remaining concepts and documentation eventually transitioned into museum and historical archives.

== See also ==
Related development

- Gyrodyne QH-50 DASH

Aircraft of comparable role, configuration, and era

- American Helicopter XH-26 Jet Jeep
- Gyrodyne RON Rotorcycle
- Hiller YROE
- Hoppi-Copter
- Kaman KSA-100 SAVER

Related lists

- List of single seat helicopters
