= Nagler-Rolz NR 54 =

German experimental backpack helicopter

NR 54
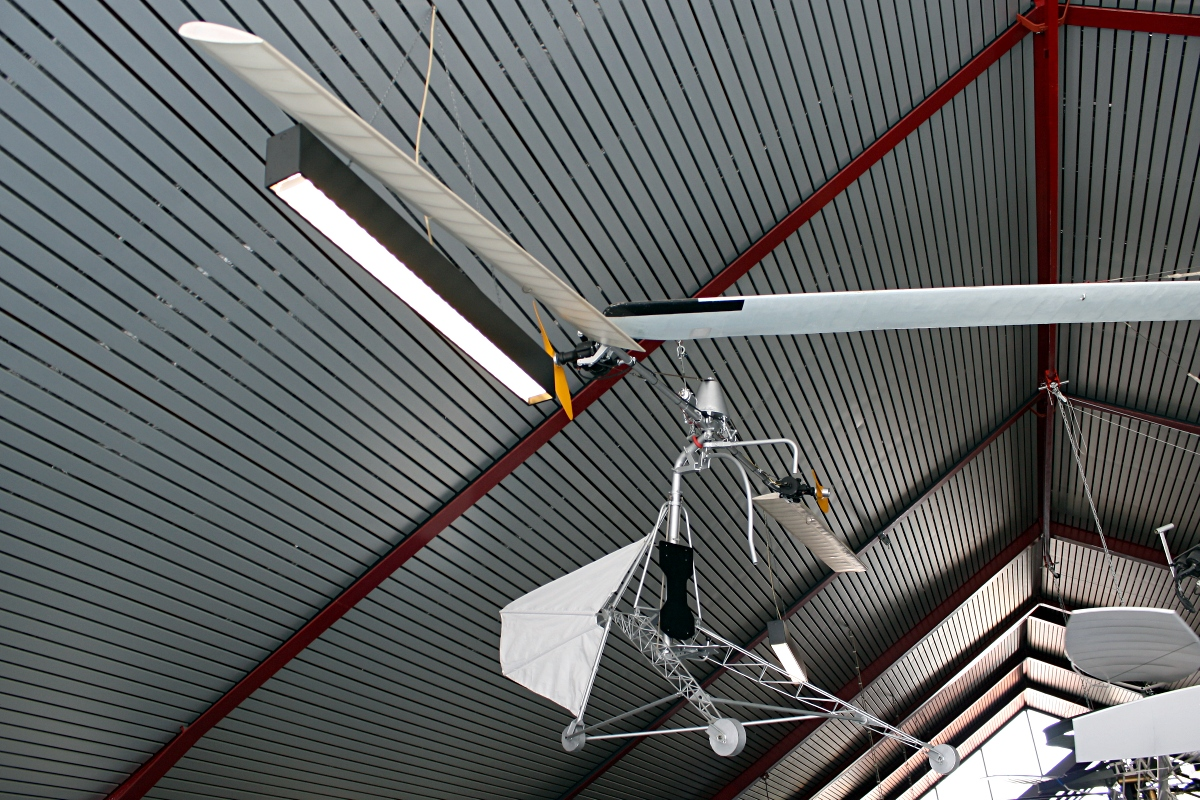
- NR 54 V2 replica at Hubschraubermuseum Bückeburg

General information
- Type: backpack helicopter
- National origin: Germany
- Manufacturer: Nagler-Rolz Flugzeugbau GmbH
- Status: Abandoned
- Number built: 2 (NR 54); 1 (NR 55)

History
- Introduction date: 1940 (NR 55); 1941 (NR 54)

The Nagler-Rolz NR 54 is a German experimental foldable backpack helicopter developed during World War II. An enlarged variant, the NR 55, was also built.

== Design and development ==
The NR 54 was developed by Austrian engineers Bruno Nagler and Franz Rolz. The helicopter featured a three-legged undercarriage design and a single seat. The NR 54 V1 prototype featured a single-bladed rotor, while the V2 prototype had a more traditional two-bladed unit. Both prototypes were powered by a piston engines mounted on the rotor blades, with the V1 having a single 24 hp (18 kW) engine driving two contra-rotating propellers, and the V2 having two 8 hp (6.0 kW) single-cylinder variants of the Argus As 8. This configuration eliminated torque, negating the need for a tail rotor.

The enlarged NR 55 a proof of concept aircraft based on the configuration of the NR 54 V1 and was powered by a 40 hp engine in an aerodynamic fairing.

== Operational history ==
The NR 55 was the first airframe built, and conducted a successful hover during indoor testing. Centrifugal forces on the engine caused fuel flow problems, which in turn led to vibration problems, and the propellers created a gyroscopic effect which interfered with the flapping hinges of the rotor. These problems were not fixed on the NR 54 V1 and V2, which were not flown before testing was halted by the Soviet advance in Vienna.

Nagler evaded the Red Army and was interviewed by the British after the war. The NR 54 V1 remained in Austria, while the V2 was captured by American forces after the war, who evaluated it at Freeman Army Airfield. The NR 55 had been destroyed by an Allied bombing raid in 1944.

== Variants ==
NR 54 V1
First prototype with a single-bladed rotor.
NR 54 V2
Second prototype with a two-bladed rotor.
NR 55
Enlarged proof of concept prototype.

== Survivors ==
The NR 54 V2 is currently on display at the Steven F. Udvar-Hazy Center in Chantilly, Virginia.

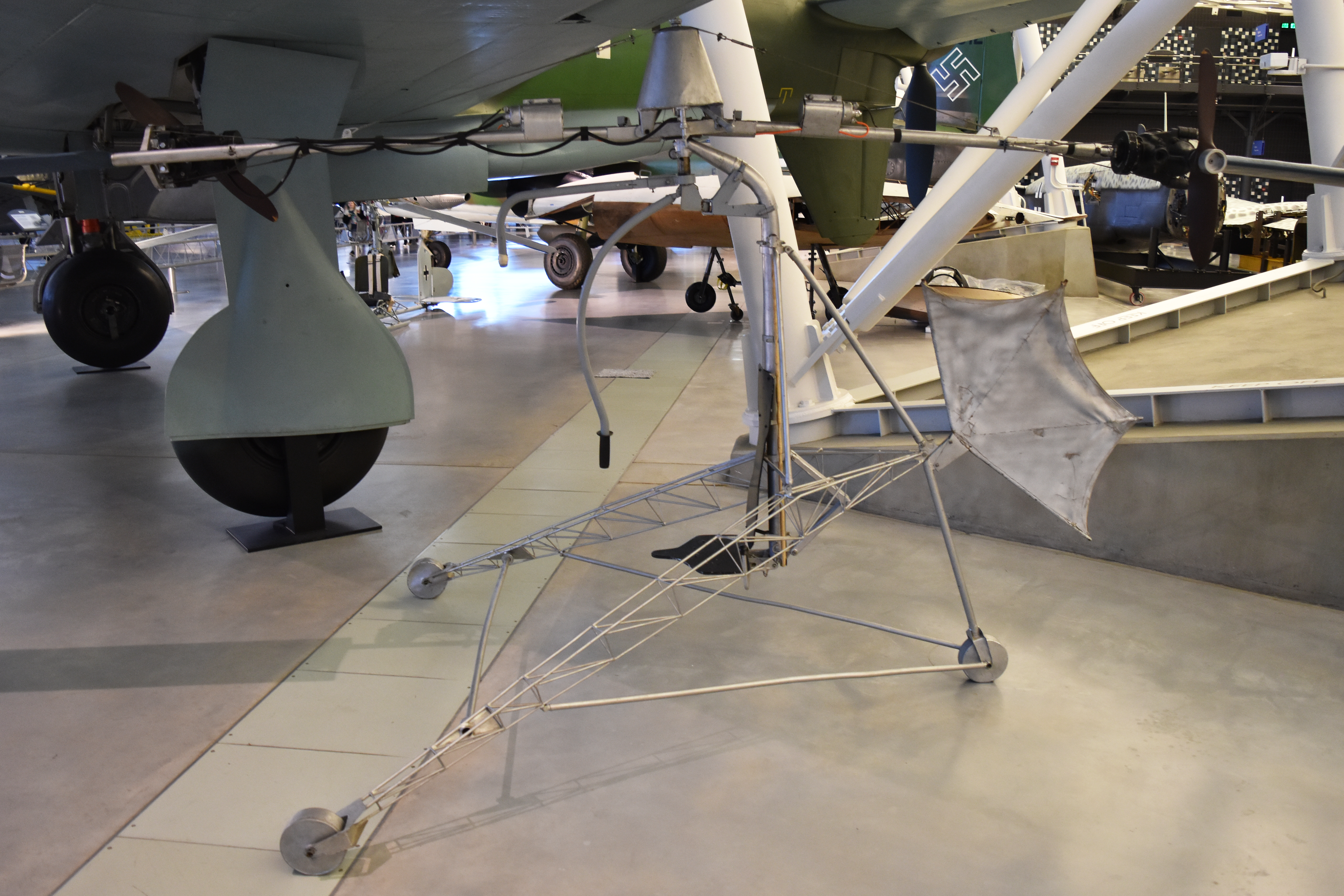
The original NR 54 V2 at the Steven F. Udvar-Hazy Center.

== Specifications (NR 54 V2) ==
Data from

General characteristics

- Crew: 1
- Length: 2.42 m (7 ft 11 in)
- Height: 2.18 m (7 ft 2 in)
- Empty weight: 36.5 kg (80 lb)
- Gross weight: 140 kg (309 lb)
- Powerplant: 2 × Argus As 8 ZF single-cylinder two-stroke engine, 6.0 kW (8 hp) each
- Main rotor diameter: 8.0 m (26 ft 3 in)
- Propellers: 2-bladed, 0.60 m (1 ft 11 in) diameter

Performance

== See also ==
Aircraft of comparable role, configuration, and era

- Baumgärtl Heliofly III
- Hiller ROE Rotorcycle
- Hoppi-Copter

Related lists

- List of single seat helicopters
