= Kuang-Chi =

Company in Shenzhen, China

- Type: private
- Traded as: CSI A500 (Kuang-Chi Technologies)
- Industry: metamaterials; smart-city; tele-communication
- Founded: July 13, 2010; 16 years ago
- Founders: Liu Ruopeng; Ji Chunlin; Luan Lin; Zhang Yangyang; Zhao Zhiya
- Headquarters: Shenzhen, China
- Area served: China; Hong Kong; South East Asia; Europe; Middle East; North America
- Number of employees: 2600
- Subsidiaries: Kuang-Chi Technologies; Kuangchi Science
- Website: www.kuang-chi.com

Kuang-Chi Group (/kwɑːŋˈtʃiː/; Chinese: 光启; pinyin: Guāng Qǐ) is a Chinese company that develops and invests in metamaterial, telecommunication, aerospace, smart-city, AI and digital health technologies.

Kuang-Chi was founded in 2010 by five Chinese PhD scholars, led by Ruopeng Liu. Headquartered in Shenzhen, China, it has public and private subsidiaries, research facilities and investments in several countries. In 2017, KuangChi Science, the Hong Kong publicly listed affiliate, was valued at a market capitalization of over US$2 billion and Kuang-Chi Technologies, the Shenzhen-listed affiliate, at a valuation exceeding US$6 billion.

While Kuang-Chi is not a state-owned enterprise, the Chinese government has supported the company's research. In 2012, Kuang-Chi was the first company Xi Jinping, current General Secretary of the Chinese Communist Party visited as party leader. In 2017, Kuang-Chi joined other leading Chinese technology companies such as Baidu, Alibaba and Tencent in investing nearly US$12 billion into the state-owned telecommunications company China Unicom, the start of a government initiative to introduce private-sector expertise and innovation into China's state owned enterprises.

Kuang-Chi has participated in Chinese government initiatives, including the Go Out Policy of investing in international technology and the One Belt One Road Program of engaging with countries in the "Silk Road Economic Belt". In 2016, Kuang-Chi set up an international fund operating out of Shenzhen and Tel Aviv, Israel. The fund planned to invest up to US$300 million as of 2017.

== History ==
=== Background ===
Kuang-Chi was founded by five PhD students that had recently concluded their studies at Duke and Oxford University: Liu Ruopeng, Lin Luan, Chunlin Ji, Yangyang Zhang, and Zhiya Zhao. They remain the senior executives of Kuang-Chi. Zhang and Luan are the co-CEOs of KuangChi Science, and Zhao is the CEO of Kuang-Chi Technologies.

Liu was part of a team of researchers at Duke University that researched metamaterials, developing a device capable of "cloaking" an object from visual light, thus making it invisible. Upon graduation, Liu and his colleagues decided to return to China and launch a high-tech research institute. With support from Shenzhen, the commercial city bordering Hong Kong in mainland China, Kuang-Chi Institute of Advanced Technology was established with the slogan “Future is Now,” in the center of China's special economic zone.

Kuang-Chi was named after Chinese scientist Xu Guangqi (pinyin: Guāng Qǐ) from the Ming Dynasty, who made important contributions in math, agriculture, astronomy and other scientific fields. The name, which literally means "to enlighten," was chosen as a symbol of the company's commitment to advancing the frontier of science and bridging western and eastern knowledge.

Thanks to the rapid growth of the company and the advanced nature of its technology - particularly in aerospace - Kuang-Chi is often compared to SpaceX by media, while Ruopeng Liu is referred to as the "Chinese Elon Musk."

=== 2010–2014 ===
On 13 July 2010, Kuang-Chi Institute of Advanced Technology was officially founded.(Chinese: 深圳光启高等理工研究院) A state-level Laboratory of Metamaterial Electromagnetic Modulation Technology was also established at Kuang-Chi, led by Kuang-Chi's chairman Liu Ruopeng and vice chairmen Ji Chunlin and Zhao Zhiya .

Around the same time, Kuang-Chi displayed its Intelligent Photon product series at the China High Tech Fair. The first to try the product was Wang Yang, member of the Political Bureau of the CCP Central Committee and vice premier of the State Council. On 22 September 2014, Kuang-Chi's subsidiary KuangChi Science (Chinese: 光啟科學) was first publicly listed on the Hong Kong Stock Exchange.(SEHK: 439) The Reorient Group was chaired by Johnson Ko, currently a director of KuangChi Science.

In November 2014, KuangChi Science signed a contract with Airways New Zealand to begin work on Traveler, China's first near-space commercial platform. Xi Jinping and New Zealand Prime Minister John Key attended the signing ceremony. In December, Kuang-Chi launched the Appollo Base in Shenzhen and exhibited the Cloud, a multifunctional aerostat that aims to provide smart-city solutions. The Dongguan Institute of Advanced Technology was founded the same year to further research in the Cloud.

=== 2015-present ===
In 2015, Kuang-Chi became the majority shareholder of Martin Aircraft Co Ltd., an aviation company publicly listed in Australia, and subsequently displayed Martin Aircraft's flagship product Martin Jetpack at different exhibitions worldwide. The Jetpack was introduced during the 2015 Future Flight Show in Shenzhen. Later in the same year, Kuang-Chi invested a majority share in Solar Ship Inc., a Canadian developer of a hybrid airship capable of remote freight transport.

In May 2016, Kuang-Chi launched the GCI Fund & Incubator based in Tel Aviv, Israel, planning to invest up to US$300 million in global technology companies. Kuang-Chi's local partner in Israel is Dorian Barak, the former head of M&A at Bank Hapoalim, Israel's largest financial group.

In June 2016, Kuang-Chi expanded its strategic partnership with Singapore-based HyalRoute Communications Group, one of the largest providers of advanced telecommunication infrastructure in the Asia-Pacific. Kuang-Chi also established an ASEAN Innovation Headquarter in Singapore, focused on smart-city solutions. Within China, Kuang-Chi unveiled the Luoyang Institute of Cutting-edge Technology, an innovation center of new materials and hardware design.

== Technology ==
Kuang-Chi technologies cover a range of disciplines, many of which are commercialized as integrated smart-city solutions.

=== Metamaterial ===
Applications of metamaterial technology advanced by Kuang-Chi include wireless and space communications.

=== Visible Light Communication ===
Intelligent photonic communication is a technology for financial transactions, identification and authorization. Kuang-Chi's photonic product Photon Pay is designed to replace credit cards through a new payment solution using mobile phones. The system generates a unique visible light that is encoded with each transaction's information and special algorithms to ensure security.

Other applications of Kuang-Chi's photonic technology involve ID recognition, access permission and product authentication.

=== Telecommunications ===
Telecommunication technologies under development by Kuang-Chi include Super-Wifi, Satellite Communications, and Fiber Optics Communication networks developed by a subsidiary active in SE Asia named HyalRoute Communication Group. HyalRoute has implemented telecommunication networks covering 25 provincial districts in Cambodia and over 10000 km (6214 miles) of FOC networks in Myanmar, boosting the communication capacity of these countries. In August 2017, Kuang-Chi invested in China Unicom, reportedly to partner with the major telecommunication company in big-data and the internet of things technologies.

=== Aerostat ===
Aerostats are large helium-filled balloons used for aerial surveillance and communications. The Cloud is an aerostat designed by Kuang-Chi for civilian use - 48m long and 20m high, the Cloud floats 300m above the ground and can carry a 600 kg payload. It is designed to measure air-quality, provide traffic information, facilitate communications and internet access, and monitor public safety. Following a test launch in 2015, the Cloud began serving the city of Dongguan in southeastern China and later the city of Zunyi in southwestern China.

=== Aerospace Technology ===
Kuang-Chi partners with UK-based Gilo Industries Applied Technology, which designs a range of aerospace products, from rotary engines to flying vehicles.

Another partner of Kuang-Chi, Martin Aircraft Co Ltd., develops Martin Jetpack, the world's first commercial jetpack named by Time Magazine as one of the 50 Best Inventions of 2010. The jetpack operates via two air ducts, remains static in confined spaces, vertically take off and land (VTOL), and carries a payload of 120 kg. Flight tests in New Zealand have resulted in a speed of 800 feet per minute and an altitude of 5,000 feet. The jetpack is intended for search and rescue missions.

Kuang-Chi is also partnering with Solar Ship Inc., a Canadian company that designs a hybrid airship for [cargo transport. Unlike freight airships under design by Lockheed Martin and Worldwide Aeros, the Solar Ship vehicle incorporates gas and solar power as well as traditional bush-plane aerodynamics to achieve take-off and landing in extremely limited space.

Unmanned aerial vehicles (UAVs or drones) for use in urban environments are also under development by Kuang-Chi, including the H1, a tethered UAV for monitoring large areas. SkyX Systems Corp., a Kuang-Chi subsidiary based in Toronto, Canada, has developed a drone system that monitors long-range pipelines and other utilities.

=== Near-Space Technology ===
A helium-filled balloon carries a 'Traveler' capsule into the stratosphere at an altitude of 24,000 meters (80,000 feet). Once operational, passengers in the capsule will be able to see the blackness of space and the curvature of the planet. The Traveler is equipped with solar panes.

== Global investment ==
In 2015 Kuang-Chi began actively investing in technology companies outside of China, and has since established a Global Community of Innovation (GCI), a platform to integrate external technologies and pursue further investments. The USD300 million GCI Fund is managed by teams in China and Israel, led by Zhi Li and Dorian Barak, Kuang-Chi's local partner in Israel and a member of the board of KuangChi Science.

Foreign investments have enabled Kuang-Chi to establish a global brand in high-technology and integrate Western and Chinese R&D in aerospace, smart city and other areas. In addition to capital support, Kuang-Chi also enters into joint venture and technology licensing agreements with its partners and advises them on penetration into the Chinese market.

Kuang-Chi's first international investment was in Martin Aircraft, a New Zealand public company developing the world's first practical jetpack, now led by James West. Kuang-Chi also invested in Solar Ship, a Canadian company led by Jay Godsall that designs a hybrid airship capable of heavy cargo transport to remote locations, alongside a network of aerostats and solar-powered hangars.

In 2017, Kuang-Chi invested in Gilo Industries Applied Technology, a UK aerospace company led by Gilo Cardozo and Jim Edmondson that specializes in aeronautical vehicles and propulsion systems, including the Parajet Skyquad, a flying car, paragliders, and ultra-lightweight and advanced rotary engines.

The GCI Fund invested in gesture control company eyeSight Technologies (Gideon Shmuel, CEO), emotions analytic company Beyond Verbal (Yuval Mor, CEO), video intelligence provider Agent Video Intelligence (Itsik Kattan, CEO), biometrics authentication developer Zwipe (Kim Humborstad, CEO ), and UAV company SkyX (Didi Horn, CEO). Kuang-Chi is one of the most active Chinese investors in Israel's technology ecosystem, and is the first Chinese company to set up a fund and incubator in Israel focused on technology.

== Smart City ==
Kuang-Chi has relationships with city governments in China, Singapore and Israel. As of 2016, Kuang-Chi has opened research institutes in conjunction with local government officials in Shenzhen, Dongguan, Luoyang, Haikou and Chengdu, all in China. These research centers each focus on diverse technologies, including metamaterials in Shenzhen, aerospace in Dongguan, near-space in Haikou and unmanned aviation systems in Chengdu. Singapore and Tel Aviv also have Kuang-Chi innovation headquarters.

== Entry on Entity List ==
On 18 December 2020, Kuang-Chi Group was placed on the Entity List, a trade blacklist published by the United States Department of Commerce's Bureau of Industry and Security. It was one of 77 entities to have been determined by the U.S. Government to be acting contrary to the national security or foreign policy interests of the United States. Specifically, Kuang-Chi Group was one of four entities added for activities contrary to U.S. foreign policy interests. According to The Federal Register, published on 20 December 2020, AGCU Scientech; China National Scientific Instruments and Materials (CNSIM); DJI; and Kuang-Chi Group have enabled wide-scale human rights abuses within China through abusive genetic collection and analysis or high-technology surveillance, and/or facilitated the export of items by China that aid repressive regimes around the world, contrary to U.S. foreign policy interests.

== Controversies ==
David Webb, a Hong Kong activist, criticized Kuang-Chi's associate company Kuang-Chi Science, a listed company in the Stock Exchange of Hong Kong, regarding its shareholders structure and business. Hexun.com, a Chinese financial news portal, via its magazine 经理人, also described the group was a series of capital tactics (Chinese: 连环资本局), which the 5 founders of Kuang-Chi, were backed by other investors, in order to take over Chinese listed-company Kuang-Chi Technologies and aforementioned Kuang-Chi Science as backdoor listing. A column writer of Zhitong Caijing, even criticized the group failed to materialize their research into mass production in the group's 7 years of establishments. The column writer further criticized the company as a future concept stock, would be the next pride of Shenzhen, or just another player in capital market.
