= List of rotorcraft used in World War II =

== Germany ==
Some types in use of Luftwaffe and Kriegsmarine

- Baumgartl Heliofly I (backpack Autogyro-glider)
- Baumgartl Heliofly III-57 (two contra-rotating helicopter)
- Baumgartl Heliofly III-59 (little and light disarmable helicopter)
- Doblhoff WNF 342 (Tip-jet helicopter)
- Flettner Fl 265 (twin rotor liaison-observation helicopter, pioneer of synchropter configuration)
- Flettner Fl 282A/B "Kolibri" (reconnaissance synchropter)
- Flettner Fl 339 (reconnaissance helicopter / artillery spotter)
- Focke-Achgelis Fa 223 "Drache" - military transport helicopter, saw limited use for rescue
- Focke-Achgelis Fa 225 - single-seat rotary wing glider, one built
- Focke-Achgelis Fa 330 "Bachstelze" (Autogyro-glider/observation vehicle)
- Focke-Wulf Fw 61 - World's first practical helicopter, first flown in 1936.
- Focke-Wulf Fw C.30A - licence-built Cierva C.30A (general purpose autogyro)
- Nagler-Rolz NR 54 (one-man portable helicopter)
- Nagler-Rolz Nr 55 (one-man portable helicopter)

== United States ==
In use by USAAF, US Navy and US Coast Guard

- Kellett KD-1 (La Cierva C.30A) (general use Autogyro)
- Platt-LePage XR-1 (experimental helicopter)
- Sikorsky R-4B "Hoverfly" (general helicopter)
- Sikorsky YR-4B "Hoverfly", version of R-4, known as HNS-1 in Navy service (ambulance/sea patrol helicopter)
- Sikorsky R-6 (rescue/reconnaissance helicopter)
- Sikorsky R-5A (rescue/reconnaissance helicopter)
- Vought-Sikorsky VS-300 (experimental helicopter)

== United Kingdom ==
In use by RAF and FAA

- Avro 671 "Rota" Mk.1 (licence-built Cierva C.30A) (general purpose autogyro - used for radar station testing)
- Bristol "Heliogyro" RI/II (experimental helicopter)
- Cierva W.5 - 2-seater twin outrigger rotor helicopter, first flight 1938.
- Cierva W.6 - twin rotor helicopter, flown in 1939
- Cierva W.9 - jet efflux torque compensation design. Built in 1944 and flown in 1945.
- Hafner Rotabuggy (also known as "Malcolm Rotaplane" and "M.L. 10/42 Flying Jeep") - rotary wing glider attachment for landing jeeps. Tested in 1944 but introduction of vehicle-carrying gliders led to cancellation of project.
- Hafner Rotachute - one-man rotor-kite for landing assault troops. Not adopted but used instead for testing in support of Rotabuggy project
- Sikorsky "Hoverfly" I - service name for Sikorsky R-4 used at RAF Helicopter Training School from 1945

== Canada ==
In use for RCAF

- Avro 671 "Rota" Mk.1 (La Cierva C.30A) (general purpose Autogyro)
- Sikorsky R-4B "Hoverfly" (general purpose helicopter)

== Soviet Union ==
In use for Red Army and Soviet Air Forces (VVS)

- TsAGI (Kamov) A-7/7bis (Liaison and Observation Autogyro)

== Japan ==
In use by Japanese Army/Navy Air Service

- Kayaba Ka-1 (autogyro, developed from Kellett KD-1)
- Kayaba Ka-2 (autogyro, different engine to Ka-1)

== France ==
In use for French Army

- Breguet-Dorand Gyroplane Laboratoire
- Dorand G.20
