= Gyrodyne RON Rotorcycle =

Experimental US Navy & Marine Corps helicopter

XRON-1 Rotorcycle
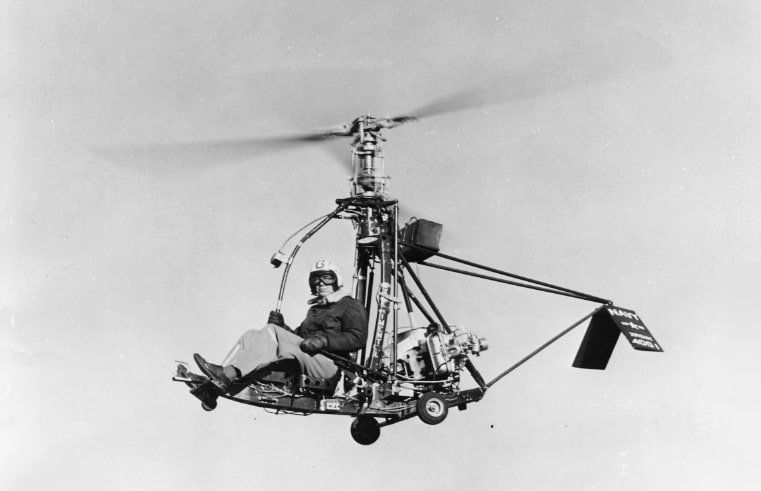
- Rotorcycle conducting a test flight

General information
- Type: Helicopter
- National origin: United States
- Manufacturer: Gyrodyne Company of America
- Primary user: United States Navy
- Number built: 10

History
- First flight: 23 November 1955
- Developed into: Gyrodyne QH-50 DASH

The Gyrodyne RON Rotorcycle (originally designated HOG) was a tiny, single-seat helicopter designed under contract for the United States Navy in the mid-1950s. It was later redesigned for a U.S. Marine Corps requirement for a small personal helicopter that would fulfill an array of roles, including observation, liaison, small unit tactical maneuvers, and which could be dropped to downed airmen behind enemy lines to facilitate their escape.

== Development ==
Gyrodyne purchased the assets of Bendix Helicopters in 1949, including the Model 2C coaxial helicopter which provided the technology for the XRON-1. In 1951 the Model 2C was demonstrated to the Navy with shortcomings noted in autorotation control. The XRON-1 was demonstrated under a new Navy contract NOas 55-388-c for a lightweight single man helicopter.

== Design ==
Gyrodyne's design was an open-framework helicopter with coaxial rotors, which was evaluated with three different power plants (two reciprocating, one turbine).

The XRON-1 used a manually started 40 hp two-cycle engine with a gross weight capability of 500 lb. The fuselage is a simple box-beam construction. The rotor uses co-axial blades which alleviate the need for an anti-torque tail rotor. Yaw control is provided by rotor tip mounted "tip brakes" providing differential torque between the rotors. Gyrodyne patented the control on 24 October 1954 Patent No. 2,835,331. There is a small inverted V-tail for control at forward speeds. The rotors are laminated wood construction. The mast is pressure lubricated and becomes a cooling surface for oil inflight. The landing gear consists of three small wheels.

== Operational history ==
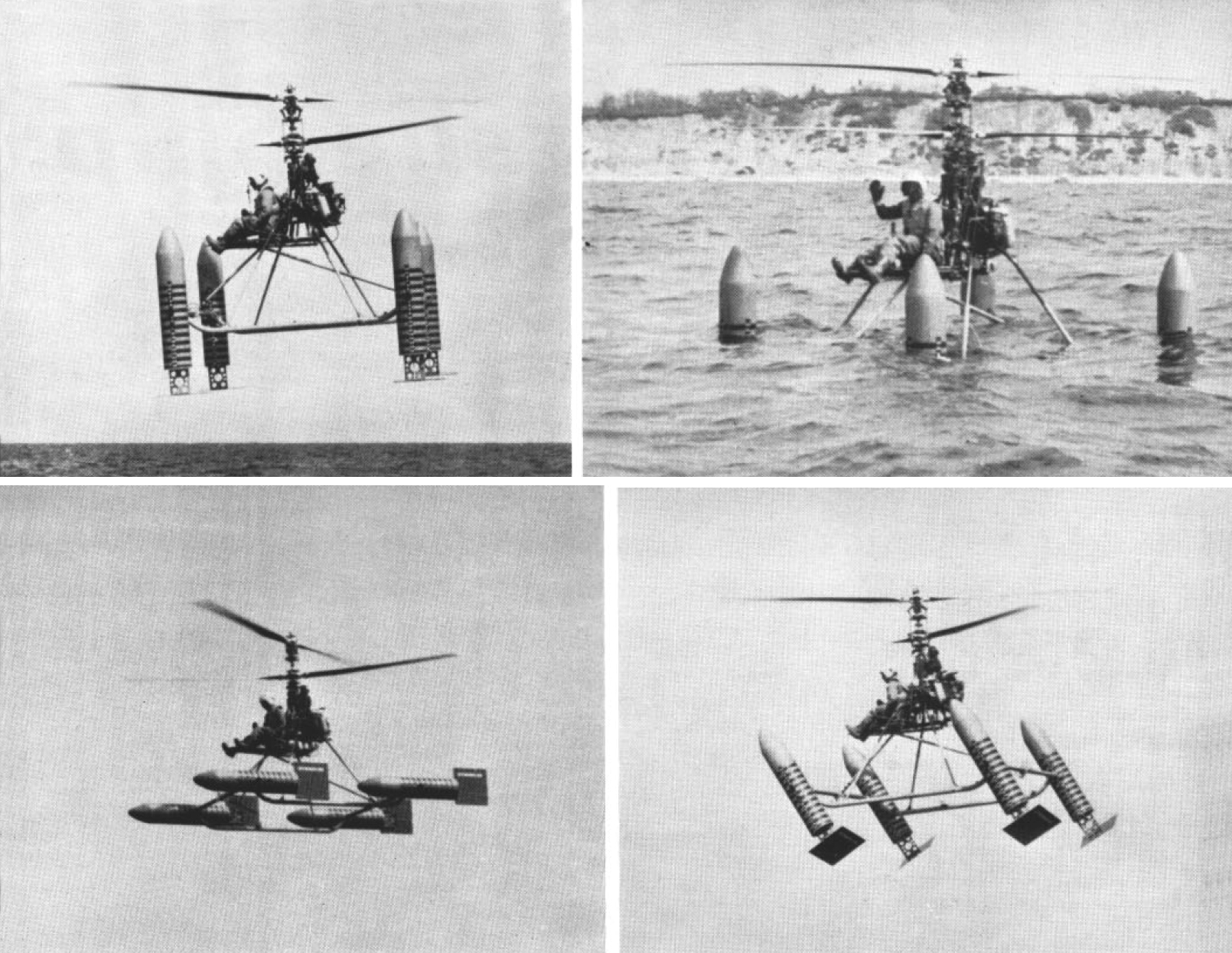
Gyrodyne RON Rotorcycle making a water landing

The first flight was in November 1955. The two-cycle engine was prone to overheating and other engines were added to the program for testing. The Marine Corps also tested one XRON-1, and three YRON-1 prototypes.

The Marine Corps eventually concluded that both the RON, and the competing Hiller ROE Rotorcycle were too heavy and too difficult to fly and abandoned the project. The United States Navy, however, had noticed the compact size and high load-carrying capacity of the RON, and in 1960 awarded a contract to Gyrodyne to produce a radio-controlled drone version of the Rotorcycle, to be used as an Anti-Submarine Warfare platform. Using the dynamic components of the RON, this was eventually developed as the Gyrodyne QH-50.

The Rotorcycle went on to win the prize for most maneuverable helicopter at the Paris Air Show in 1961, and was selected for a 1964 trade fair in Morocco by the United States Department of Commerce.

A two-place enclosed "gyrocycle" commercial variant was proposed after initial tests.

== Variants ==
XRON-1
prototype
YRON-1
- Powered by a 55 hp (41 kW) 4-stroke Porsche YO-95-2 model Model GP-702/1 600cc variant with 17 ft (5 m) diameter rotors
- Powered by a 55 hp (41 kW) Solar YT62 turbine model with 17 ft (5 m) diameter rotors
- Powered by a 72 hp (54 kW) 4-stroke Porsche YO-95-6 engine variant - Rotor diameter increased to 20 ft (6 m), 5 units built and tested at NAS Patuxent River and Camp Pendleton
- Powered by a 62 hp (46 kW) Solar T62 gas turbine engine and 15 ft (5 m) diameter rotors
- Powered by a 72 hp (54 kW) 4-stroke Porsche YO-95-8 DSN-1/QH-50A engine
- Powered by a 125 hp (93 kW) Electric Engine with 50 Min endurance
Model 55
- Powered by a 72 HP Porsche piston engine

== Surviving aircraft ==
=== Australia ===
- 4008 – XRON airworthy with Coax Helicopters of Parramatta, New South Wales
- 4015 – XRON airworthy with Coax Helicopters of Parramatta, New South Wales

=== United States ===
- 4005 – XRON-1 on static display at the New England Air Museum in Windsor Locks, Connecticut
- 4012 – YRON-1 on static display at the Pima Air & Space Museum in Tucson, Arizona
- 4013 – YRON-1 on static display at the Hickory Aviation Museum in Hickory, North Carolina
- 4014 – XRON-1 on static display at the Cradle of Aviation Museum in New York, New York
- XRON-1 in storage at the Buffalo and Erie County Naval & Military Park in Buffalo, New York
- XRON-1 on static display at the National Museum of Transportation in Saint Louis, Missouri
- RON on static display at Patriots Point in Charleston, South Carolina

== Specifications ==
Data from Jane's All The World's Aircraft 1961–62

General characteristics

- Crew: 1
- Length: 11 ft 6 in (3.51 m)
- Empty weight: 550 lb (249 kg)
- Gross weight: 832 lb (377 kg)
- Max takeoff weight: 906 lb (411 kg)
- Powerplant: 1 × Porsche YO-95-6 4-cylinder air-cooled horizontally-opposed piston engine, 72 hp (54 kW)
- Main rotor diameter: 2 × 20 ft (6.1 m)
- Main rotor area: 314 sq ft (29.2 m^{2})

Performance

- Maximum speed: 78 mph (126 km/h, 68 kn)
- Cruise speed: 60 mph (97 km/h, 52 kn)
- Range: 55 mi (89 km, 48 nmi)
- Ferry range: 112 mi (180 km, 97 nmi) (overload weight, auxiliary fuel)
- Service ceiling: 12,400 ft (3,800 m)
- Rate of climb: 1,140 ft/min (5.8 m/s)

== See also ==
Related development

- Gyrodyne QH-50 DASH

Aircraft of comparable role, configuration, and era

- American Helicopter XH-26 Jet Jeep
- Hiller CAMEL
- Hiller YROE
- Hoppi-Copter
- Kaman KSA-100 SAVER

Related lists

- List of single seat helicopters
