= Liu Ruopeng =

Chinese entrepreneur

- Born: September 24, 1983 (age 43)
- Education: Zhejiang University; Duke University
- Political party: Chinese Communist Party

Liu Ruopeng (Chinese: 刘若鹏) is a Chinese entrepreneur who founded the conglomerate Kuang-Chi. He is also a member of the Chinese Communist Party and a National People's Congress deputy.

== Early life ==
Liu has a bachelor's degree in engineering from Zhejiang University. He has a master's degree and a doctorate from Duke University.

== Career ==
While a PhD student at Duke University, Liu allegedly stole intellectual property from a United States Department of Defense-funded laboratory and passed it to Chinese researchers. Liu was investigated by the Federal Bureau of Investigation (FBI), but ultimately was not charged with a crime. The incident is the subject of a book by ProPublica senior editor Daniel Golden, Spy Schools: How the CIA, FBI, and Foreign Intelligence Secretly Exploit America's Universities.

In 2015, Liu bought a controlling stake in the loss making New Zealand company Martin Aircraft Company, makers of the yet to be commercially viable Martin Jetpack.

He is the president of the Shenzhen-based Kuang-Chi Institute of Advanced Technology and the chairman of Hong Kong-listed KuangChi Science.

== Personal life ==
Liu Ruopeng lives in Shenzhen, China.
