= Backpack helicopter =

Helicopter system designed to be worn on a person's back

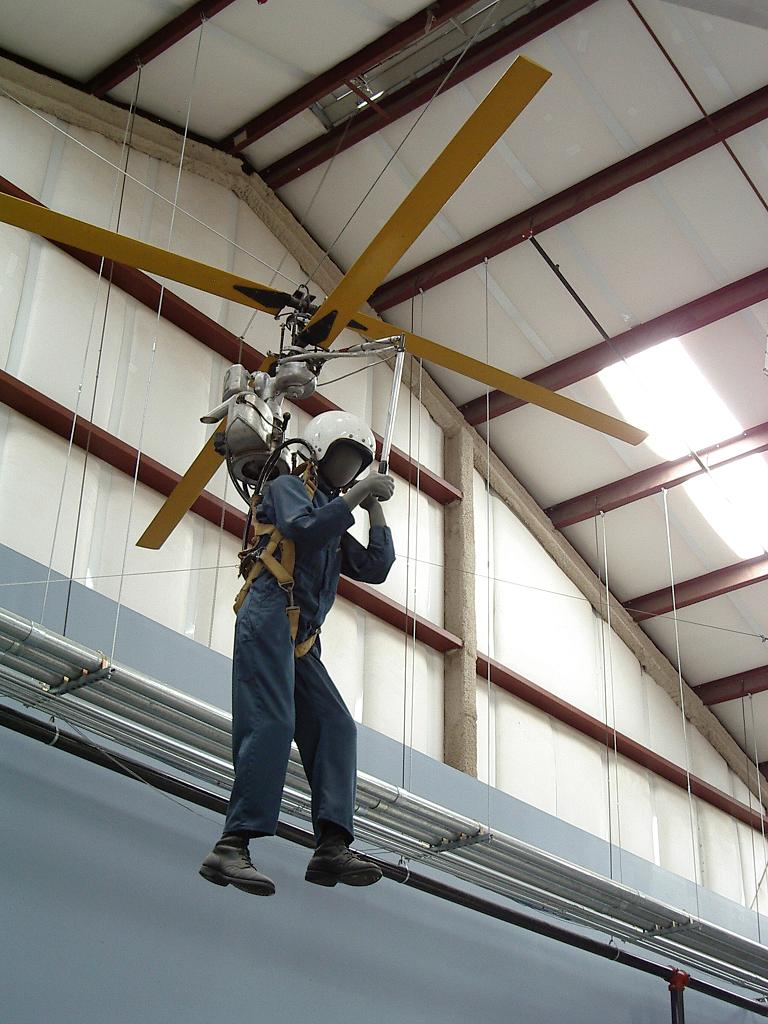
The Pentecost HX-1 Hoppi-Copter, a functional backpack helicopter

A backpack helicopter / helipack is a helicopter motor and rotor and controls assembly that can be strapped to a person's back, so they can walk about on the ground wearing it, and can use it to fly. It uses a harness like a parachute harness and should have a strap between the legs (so the pilot does not fall out of the harness during flight). Some designs may use a ducted fan design to increase upward thrust. Several inventors have tried to make backpack helicopters, with mixed results.

Typically, a backpack helicopter differs from a conventional helicopter in two main ways:

First, there is no tail rotor, and the main rotors are contra-rotating. Yaw is controlled by fine adjustment of a differential gear in the rotor drive transmission. When one rotor is adjusted to spin slightly faster than the other, it induces yaw (turning motion).

Second, the rotors are fixed pitch, which assists with simplicity; this means, however, that in the event of engine failure autorotation is impossible. Usually, a ballistic parachute would be incorporated for safety.

An edition of Popular Science magazine in 1969 featured a backpack helicopter that used small jet engines in a tip jet configuration instead of contra-rotating rotors. This design could function in autorotation. Related are devices like a backpack helicopter which also include a seat and leg supports, which are small, open-topped helicopters. In theory, a helicopter would be more efficient than a rocket-powered jetpack, possessing a greater specific impulse, and being more suited to hovering, due to the lower velocities of the propelled gases.

Australian electric company CopterPack had developed "an electric backpack helicopter with a self-levelling autopilot", and released test videos in June 2021. However, the device consists of two rotors with diameters around 3 feet (0.91 m) connected via carbon fiber tubes to a backpack with battery packs, and a pair of armrests with hand controls on them. Later video analysis revealed the operator and equipment were at the end of a drop cable that was edited out using post-production software.

== Examples ==
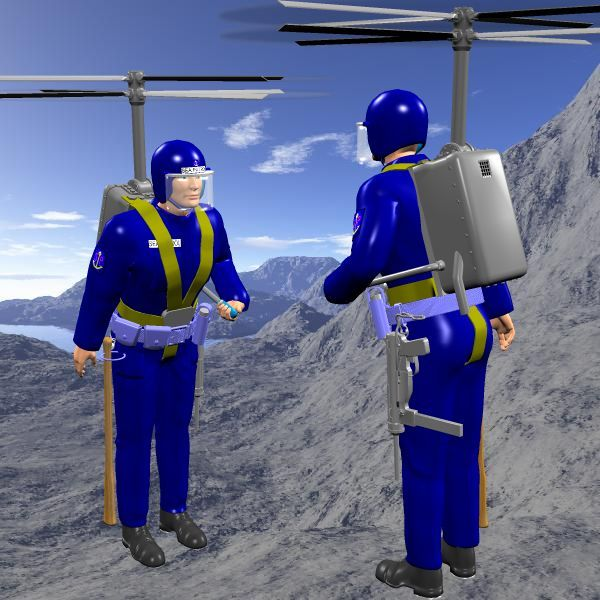
A possible design for a helibackpack with contra-rotating twin rotors

=== Pure backpacks ===
- The Heliofly was a make which was designed in Germany in 1941 onwards.
- The Pentecost HX-1 Hoppi-Copter was developed by Horace T. Pentecost, an independent inventor and demonstrated to the military in 1945.
- Rhyme (made in Japan)
- The Libelula ("dragonfly") from Tecnologia Aeroespacial Mexicana has a 2-bladed rotor driven by a small rocket motor at the end of each rotor blade. The company also manufactures a jetpack.

=== With a seat ===
- SoloTrek XFV (Exo-skeletal Flying Vehicle).
- Martin Jetpack
- Vortech designed various models which have seats. They formerly also made a pure backpack model with two very long rotor blades driven by a little propane-powered jet motor at the end of each blade.
- GEN H-4
- Hirobo bit
- Trek Aerospace's Springtail

== See also ==
- Baumgärtl Heliofly III
- Jet pack
- Hovercar
- Ultralight aircraft
- Gyrodyne RON Rotorcycle
- Hiller ROE-1 / YROE-1 "Rotorcycle"
