= XFV =

XFV may refer to:

- Lockheed XFV
- Rockwell XFV-12
- SoloTrek XFV
