= Hiller YH-32 Hornet =

American ultralight helicopter

YH-32 Hornet
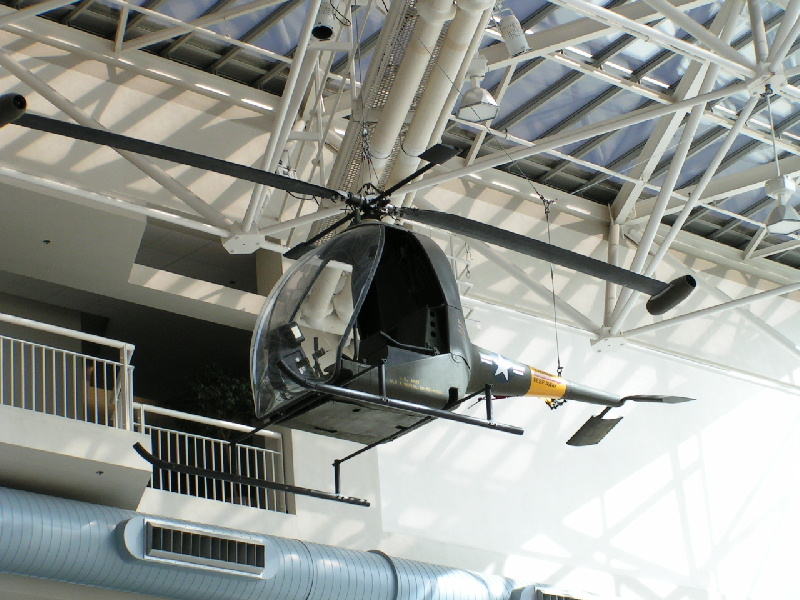
- Hiller YH-32 Hornet on display in Seattle's Museum of Flight

General information
- Type: Experimental helicopter
- Manufacturer: Hiller Aircraft
- Primary users: United States Army United States Navy
- Number built: 18

History
- Introduction date: 1954
- First flight: 1950

The Hiller YH-32 Hornet (company designation HJ-1) was an American ultralight helicopter built by Hiller Aircraft in the early 1950s. It was a small and unique design: it was powered by two Hiller 8RJ2B ramjet engines mounted on the rotor blade tips, which weighed 13 lb (5.9 kg) each and delivered an equivalent of 45 hp (34 kW) for a total of 90 hp (67 kW). Versions of the HJ-1 Hornet were built for the United States Army and the United States Navy in the early 1950s.

The Hiller Museum identifies the YH-32A, named the Sally Rand, as the first helicopter gunship.

The Hiller HOE-1 became the first production ramjet helicopter, and the Army and Navy flew a small number of these aircraft for a short time to test and evaluate the technology.

== Design and development ==
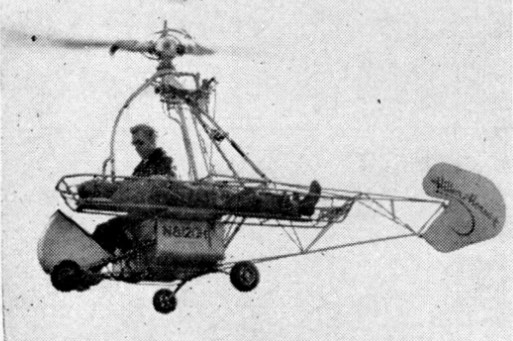
Hiller Hornet with litter attached in flight, 1951

The Hiller HJ-1 Hornet was an early attempt to build a jet-powered helicopter using ramjets, with work beginning in 1948. Before that there had been experiments with the XH-26 Jet Jeep tip rotor pulse jets.The HJ-1 ramjet tipped rotor propels the rotor and the aircraft. Unlike a conventional helicopter, this mechanically simple design avoids the need for a tail rotor.

Unfortunately, the tip speeds on helicopter rotor blades are subsonic, and ramjets are inefficient at subsonic speeds due to low compression ratio of the inlets. Therefore, the Hornet suffered from high fuel consumption and poor range. Also, the vehicle suffered from low translational speeds, and the ramjet tips were extremely noisy. In the event of power loss, autorotation was found to be difficult due to the drag from the ramjet nacelles.

The vehicle exhibited powerful lifting capacity, and there was some hope for military uses, but the high noise, poor range, and high night-time visibility of the ramjet flames failed to attract sales.

The first Hiller Hornets were not ready for delivery until late 1954, due to Hiller certificating the aircraft to Civil Aviation Authority standards rather than military specifications.

== Operational history ==
The HJ-1 was evaluated by the United States Army as the YH-32, and the United States Navy as the XHOE-1. In 1957 two YH-32s were modified as the YH-32A for trials as armed helicopters. All the fibreglass cockpit fairings were removed and the tail was modified. The tests were successful in proving the viability of the helicopter as a weapons platform, but due to marginal performance, no further conversions or orders were placed. Also, versions were sent to the U.S. Army's DRC to be evaluated in one of their contests involving the research and development of a lightweight, air droppable helicopter for air rescue and reconnaissance, and for a portable, easily-put-together, and fuel-efficient 1-man observation and transport copter. It was competing against the Jet Jeep and its pulse jets. Overall the YH-32 won out over the Jet Jeep, but the concept was considered obsolete, and later the program was canceled.

== Variants ==
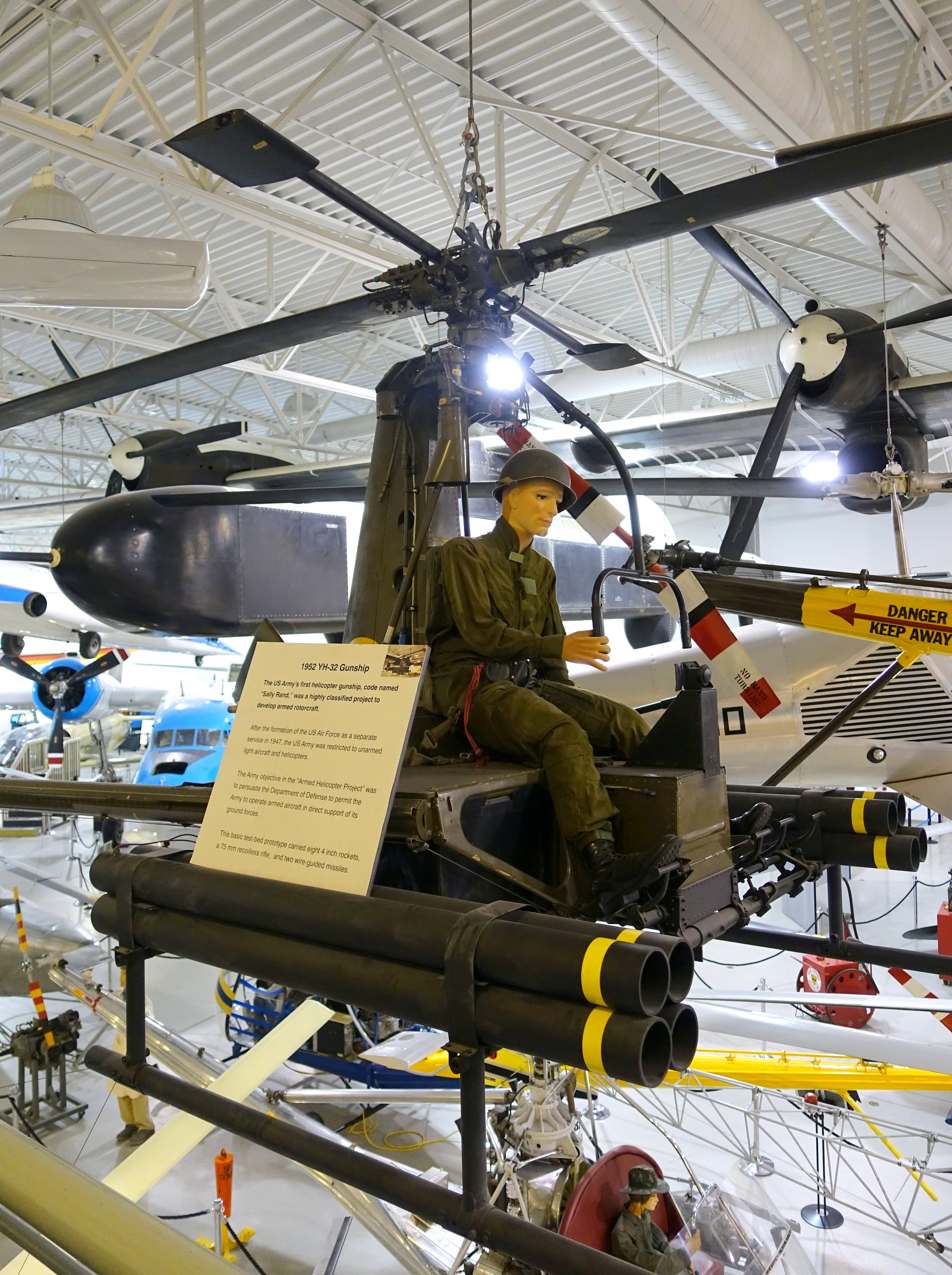
Armed "Sally Rand" version on display at the Hiller Aviation Museum

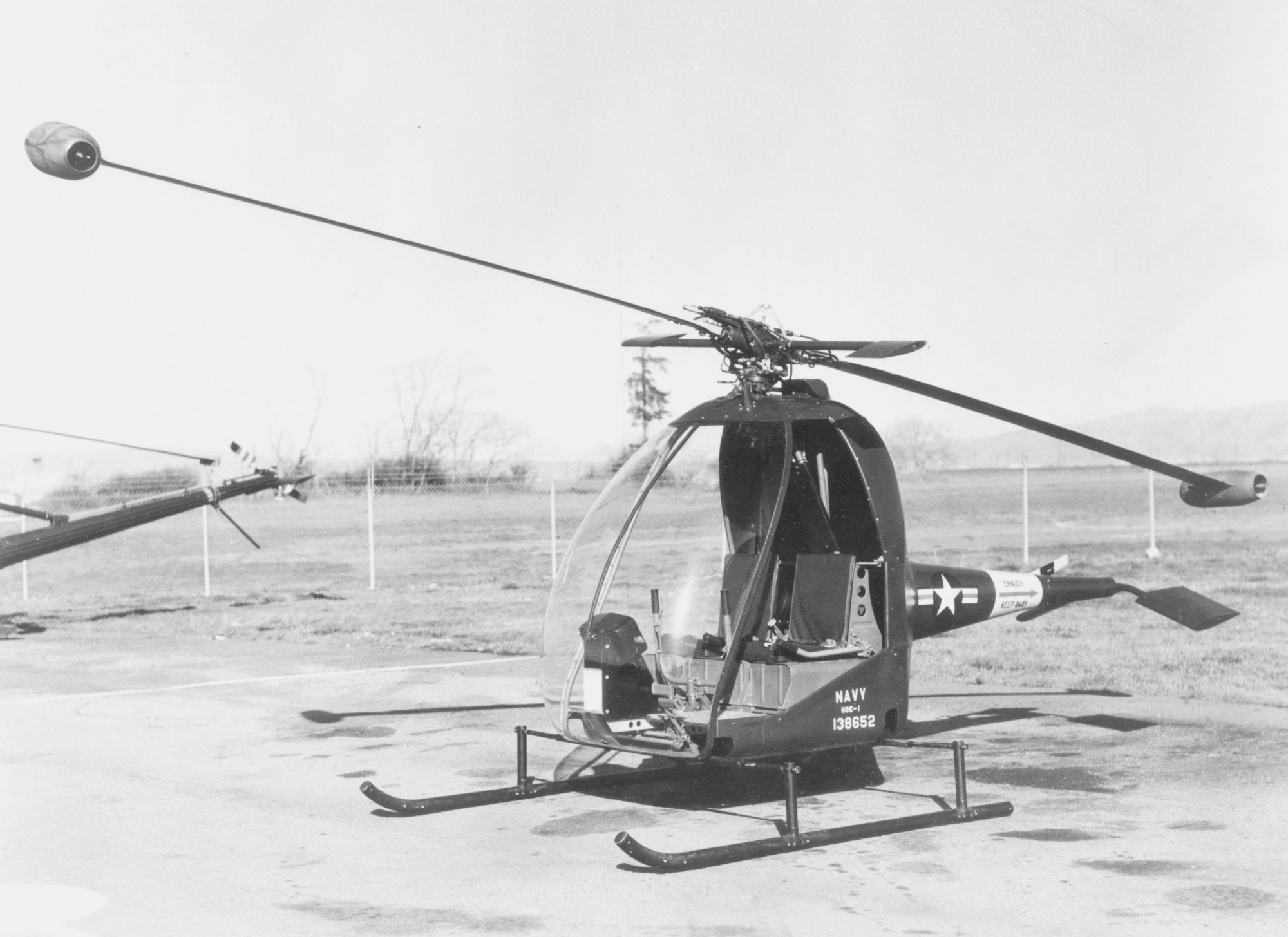
XHOE-1 (Serial Number: 138652)

HJ-1
Company designation, one prototype.
YH-32
United States Army, Similar to HJ-1 with two small v-shaped stabilizers, 14 built (2 prototypes and 12 production aircraft).
YH-32A
Two YH-32s modified for trials as an armed helicopter.
XHOE-1
Three HJ-1s for evaluation by the United States Navy in 1951.

== Aircraft on display ==
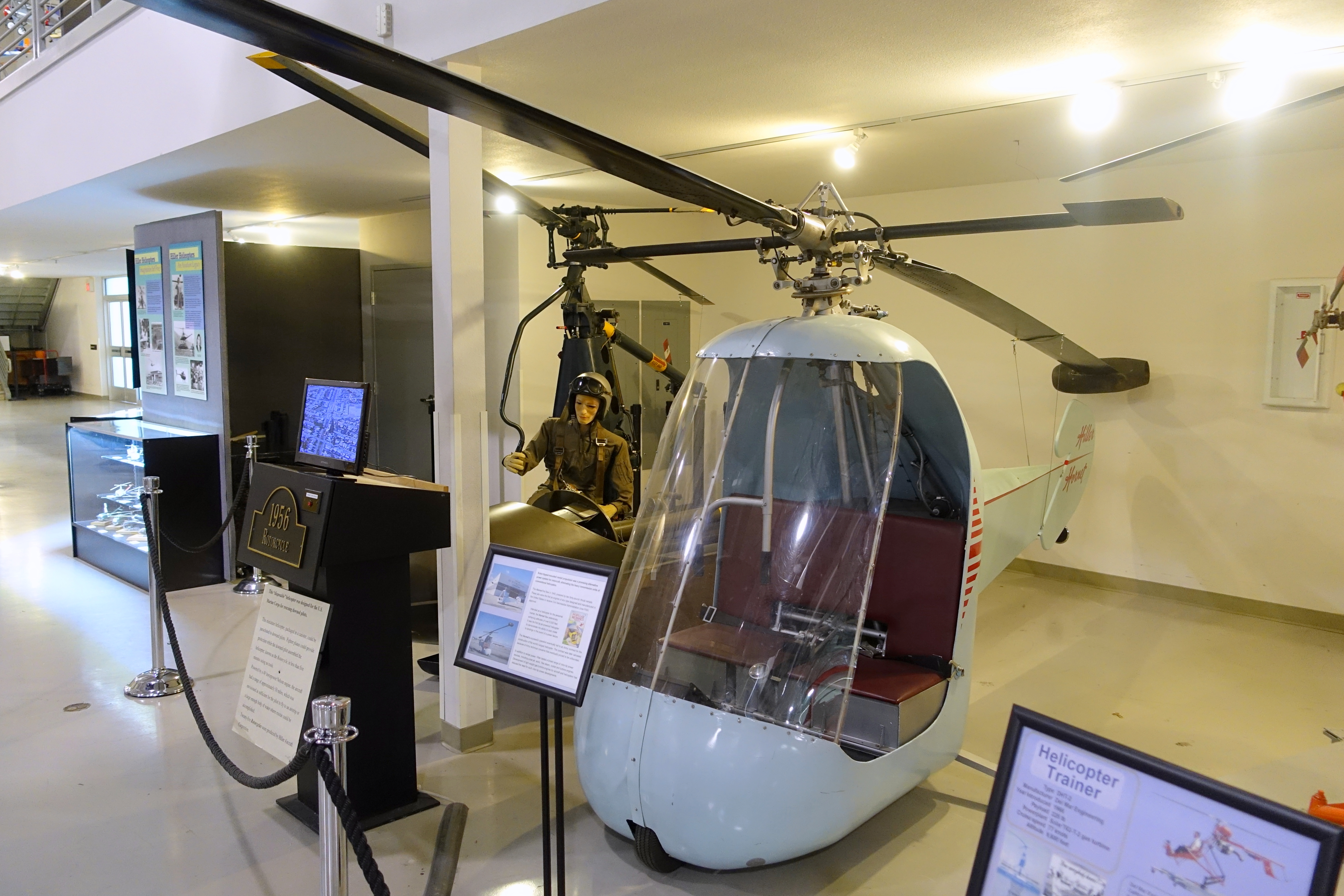
On display at the Hiller Aviation Museum

- 138652 – XHOE-1 on static display at the Udvar-Hazy Center of the National Air and Space Museum in Chantilly, Virginia.
- 53-4663 – YH-32 in storage with the Classic Rotors Museum in Victorville, California.
- 55-4965 – YH-32 in storage at the United States Army Aviation Museum at Fort Novosel in Ozark, Alabama.
- 55-4969 – YH-32 on static display at the Museum of Flight in Seattle, Washington.
- 55-4973 – YH-32 airworthy at Fantasy of Flight in Polk City, Florida.
- c/n 15 – YH-32 on display at the Classic Rotors Museum in Ramona, California.
- Unknown ID – HJ-1 on static display at the Hiller Aviation Museum in San Carlos, California.
- Unknown ID – YH-32A on static display at the Hiller Aviation Museum in San Carlos, California.

== Specifications (YH-32) ==
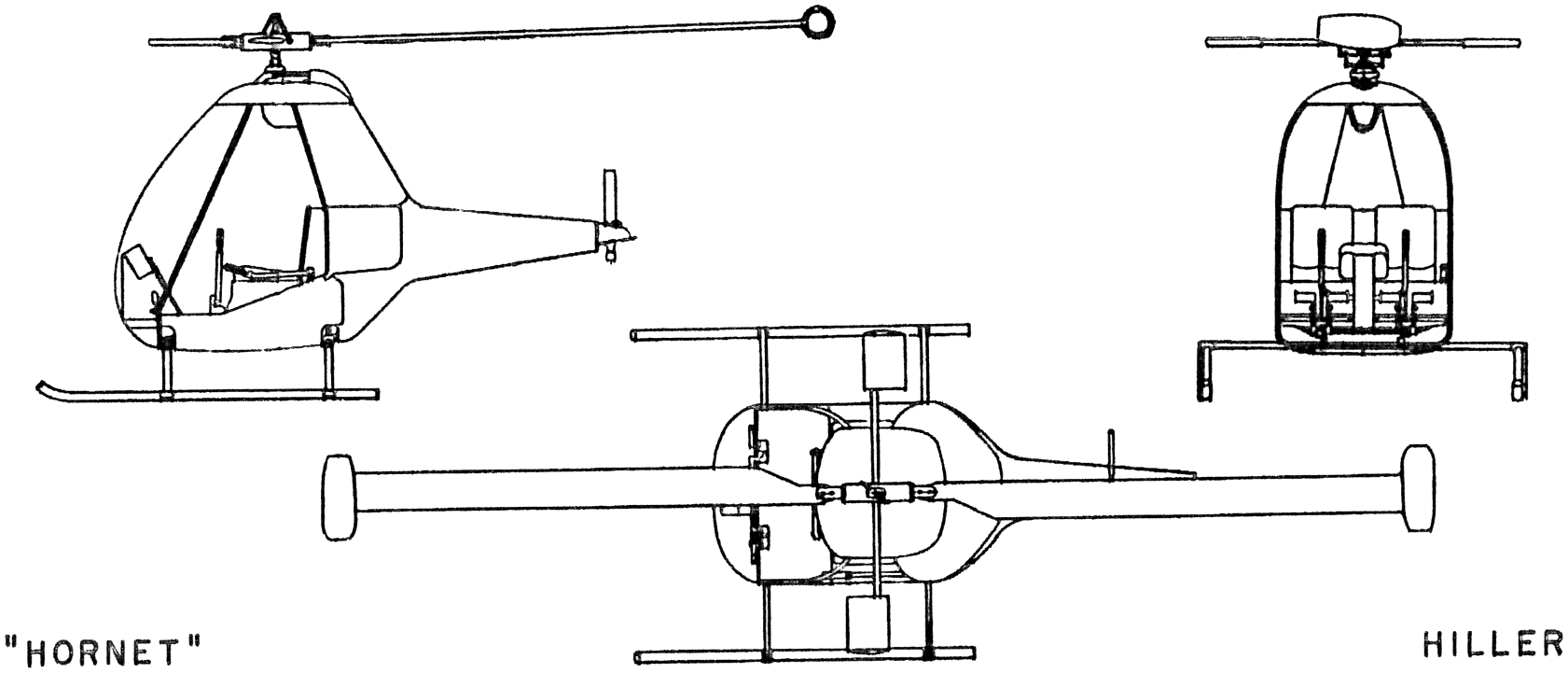
3-view line drawing of the Hiller YH-32 Hornet

Data from Jane's All the World's Aircraft 1958–59

General characteristics

- Crew: 1
- Capacity: 1 pax / 536 lb (243 kg) max. payload
- Length: 23 ft 8 in (7.21 m)
- Width: 3 ft 9 in (1.14 m) fuselage
- Height: 7 ft 10 in (2.39 m)
- Empty weight: 544 lb (247 kg)
- Gross weight: 1,080 lb (490 kg)
- Powerplant: 2 × Hiller 8RJ2B ramjet engines, 40 lbf (0.18 kN) thrust each equivalent to 45 hp (33.6 kW)
- Main rotor diameter: 23 ft (7.0 m)
- Main rotor area: 491 sq ft (45.6 m^{2})
- Blade section:NACA 0012

Performance

- Cruise speed: 69 mph (111 km/h, 60 kn)
- Range: 28 mi (45 km, 24 nmi) in still air
- Endurance: 25 minutes
- Service ceiling: 6,900 ft (2,100 m)
- Rate of climb: 700 ft/min (3.6 m/s)
- Disk loading: 2.7 lb/sq ft (13 kg/m^{2})

== See also ==
Aircraft of comparable role, configuration, and era

- American Helicopter XH-26 Jet Jeep
- McDonnell XH-20 Little Henry
- SNCASO SO.1221 Djinn (another Tip jet tested by the US Army in the 1950s, entered service with the French)

Related lists

- List of rotorcraft

== Bibliography ==
- Andrade, John. U.S. Military Aircraft Designations and Serials since 1909. Hinckley, UK: Midland Counties Publications, 1979. ISBN 0-904597-22-9.
- Apostolo, Giorgio. The Illustrated Encyclopedia of Helicopters. New York: Bonanza Books, 1984. ISBN 0-517-439352.
- Display information at Museum of Flight in Seattle, Washington.
- Flight page 725 2 November 1956
