= SoloTrek XFV =

XFV
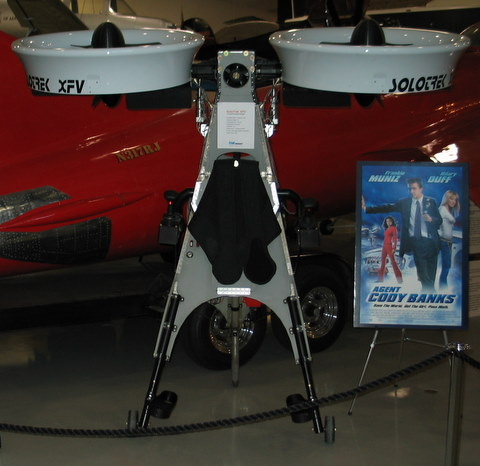
- SoloTrek XFV on display in the Hiller Aviation Museum

General information
- Type: Personal backpack helicopter
- National origin: United States
- Manufacturer: Trek Aerospace Inc
- Designer: Michael Moshier
- Status: on display at the Hiller Aviation Museum
- Number built: 1

History
- First flight: 2002
- Developed into: Trek Aerospace Springtail EFV

The SoloTrek XFV (Exo-skeletal Flying Vehicle) was a single-person VTOL aircraft. It was first flown in December 2001 by Millennium Jet Inc, a private company run by Michael Moshier. Millennium Jet subsequently changed its name to Trek Aerospace Inc. The SoloTrek pilot maintained a standing position and was propelled by two ducted fans located above and on either side of the user, leading some to class it as a type of backpack helicopter. It ran for around 2 hours on gasoline fuel. According to Michael Moshier, its inventor and designer, SoloTrek was capable of hovering for up to two hours, flying at 100 km/h and travelling more than 200 km.

One such model is featured in the 2003 movie Agent Cody Banks, though it is shown to be 'flying' only by the use of special effects. Early renderings of the SoloTrek were produced by Marc Ericksen, a Silicon Valley commercial artist and illustrator. Michael Moshier had commissioned Mark Ericksen to produce these renderings to help the company raise funding for the aircraft's development. Subsequently, the company was successful in receiving over $5 million of development funding from DARPA.

SoloTrek remains an extremely unusual design; to apply the name 'jet pack' is incorrect; the pilot was strapped into the exoskeleton frame which took the weight of the machine whilst landed, though it performed the same aim. In numerous trials at Trek Aerospace's facilities in Sunnyvale, California, the machine "appeared to perform perfectly".

During early flights, for safety reasons, the SoloTrek was 'tethered' to a crane during test flights, to prevent uncontrolled ascent or travel. The tethers were designed to retract during lift-off to avoid being sucked into the exposed ducted fans at the top of the machine, but during a flight shortly after a rain shower in December 2002, the tether failed to retract and became tangled in the propeller blades, which disintegrated. Pilot and machine dropped to the ground. The pilot walked away unharmed. Unable to stick to the tight development schedule that its backers demanded, Trek Aerospace lost funding, forcing reorganization in 2003.

After reorganization, Trek Aerospace extensively redesigned the aircraft, creating the Springtail EFV. This machine first flew in October 2003, and went on to successfully complete its DARPA contract in 2005.

Trek Aerospace continues to develop ducted fan vehicles.

The original SoloTrek XFV is on display at the Hiller Aviation Museum in San Carlos, California.

== See also ==
- Martin Jetpack
- Backpack helicopter
- NASA Puffin
