= Martin Jetpack =

Single-person aircraft

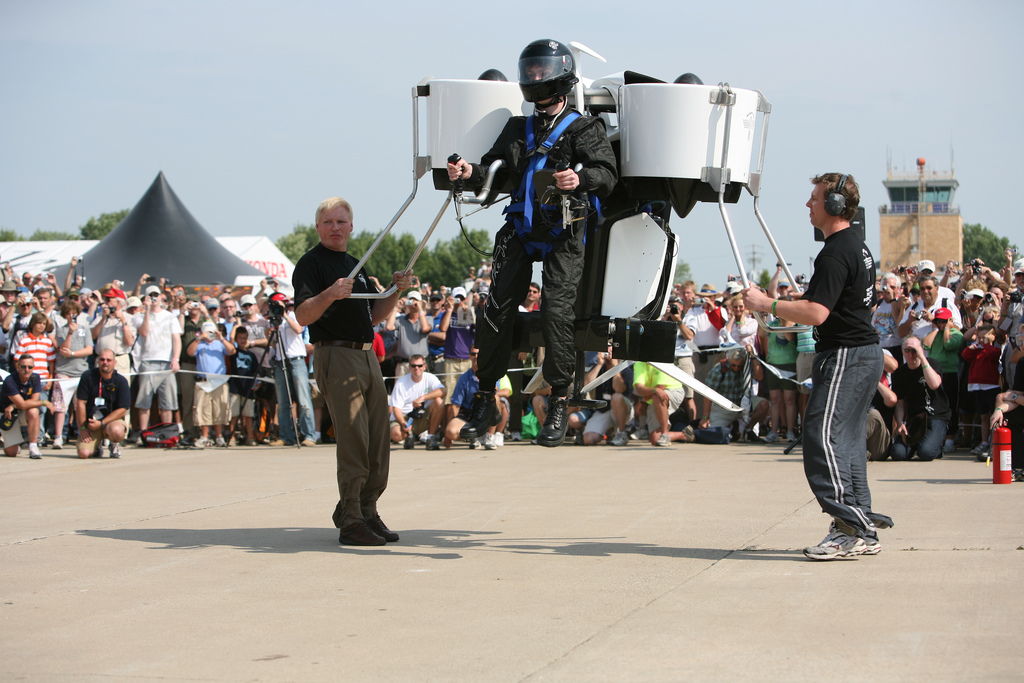
- The Martin Jetpack flying at AirVenture 2008

General information
- Type: Ultralight aircraft
- National origin: New Zealand
- Manufacturer: Martin Aircraft Co.
- Designer: Glenn Martin
- Status: company closed

History
- Introduction date: 2008
- Retired: 2019

The Martin Jetpack was a single-person aircraft under development. Despite its name, it did not use a jet pack as such, but ducted fans for lift. Martin Aircraft Company of New Zealand (not related to Glenn L. Martin Company, the US company also known as Martin Aircraft) developed it, and unveiled it at the Experimental Aircraft Association's 2008 AirVenture in Oshkosh, Wisconsin, US. The US Federal Aviation Administration classified it as an experimental ultralight airplane.

It used a petrol engine with two ducted fans to provide lift. It was specified to have a maximum speed of 40 km/h (25 mph), a flight ceiling of 2,500 ft (760 m), a range of 15–20 km (9.5–12.5 mi), and endurance of about 28 minutes of flight. Empty weight was 200 kg (440 lb). Martin Aircraft initially planned to target first responders as customers. In 2019, the company closed.

== History ==
The Martin Jetpack was under development for over 30 years. Glenn Neal Martin started work on it in his Christchurch garage in the 1980s.

New Zealand aviation regulatory authorities approved the Martin Jetpack for a limited set of manned flight tests in 2013. As of 2016, the price of the commercial production units was hoped to be US$250,000

Glenn Martin suddenly resigned on 4 June 2015 after investing 30 years in the product.

In August 2016, CEO Pete Coker was replaced by the former CFO James West. The company closed its doors in 2019, with KuangChi Science, Martin Aircraft's 52% majority shareholder, looking for a buyer for the few remaining assets.

== Description ==
The Martin Jetpack was a small VTOL device with two ducted fans to provide lift and a 2.0-litre (120 cu in) V4 piston 200-horsepower (150 kW) petrol engine. Although its pilot strapped onto it and did not sit, the device was not classed as a backpack device because it was too large to be worn while walking. However, the Martin Jetpack did not meet the US Federal Aviation Administration's classification of an ultralight aircraft; it met the weight and fuel restrictions, but it not the power-off stall speed requirement. The intention was to create a specific classification for the jetpack; it used the same petrol used in cars, was relatively easy to fly, and was expected to be cheaper to maintain and operate than other ultralight aircraft. Most helicopters require a tail rotor to counteract the rotor torque, which, along with the articulated head, complicate flying, construction, and maintenance. The Martin Jetpack was designed to be torque neutral (it had no tail rotor, no collective, no articulating or foot pedals) to simplify flying. Pitch, roll and yaw were controlled by one hand, height by the other.

=== Version P12 ===
A further version of the Martin Jetpack was built to prepare for manned flight testing. The prototype, called P12, had several design improvements over earlier versions, including lowering the position of the ducts, which reportedly resulted in better maneuverability. It also had a fully integrated fly-by-wire system. P12 was to be developed into a first responder production model. A lighter personal jetpack was hoped to follow.

=== Safety features ===
To enhance safety, the product was to feature a low-opening ballistic parachute along with carbon-fibre landing gear and pilot module.

== Flight testing ==
On 29 May 2011, the Martin Jetpack successfully completed a remotely controlled unmanned test flight to 1,500 m (5,000 ft) above sea level, and carried out a successful test of its ballistic parachute.

A second version, designated prototype P12, of the Martin Jetpack received approval from the New Zealand Civil Aviation Authority (CAA) to begin manned flight testing in August 2013. According to an investor update from August 2016, additional funding would be required to complete the certification process.

== Potential markets ==
In 2015, the company as part of its listing on the Australian Securities Exchange (ASX:MJP) stated that the jetpack could be available on the market in late 2016; it was expected to sell for about US$250,000. However, the delivery date was again postponed.

Governments were expected to be a large share of initial consumers. The first production model was aimed at military and first responder emergency crews, such as police, firefighters, and medical personnel, to enable them to have faster response times, to reach areas inaccessible by road, and to get to the top of tall buildings quickly. Interested buyers included the government of the United Arab Emirates; in November 2015, Dubai reportedly had placed an initial order for 20 units, simulators and training, for delivery in 2016.

By 2019, however, with little progress on the development of the production jetpack having occurred, the company was wound up.

== Specifications ==
Data from Company Web site

General characteristics

- Crew: 1
- Capacity: 120 kg (265 lb) payload
- Length: 1.75 m (5 ft 9 in)
- Width: 2.4 m (7 ft 10 in)
- Height: 2.2 m (7 ft 3 in)
- Empty weight: 200 kg (441 lb)
- Max takeoff weight: 320 kg (705 lb)
- Fuel capacity: 11.89 US gal (9.90 imp gal; 45.0 L)
- Powerplant: 1 × Martin Aircraft Company V4 V-4 piston engine, 150 kW (200 hp) at 6000 rpm
- Main rotor diameter: 2 × 0.8 m (2 ft 7 in)
- Main rotor area: 1 m^{2} (11 sq ft) Carbon/Kevlar composite ducted fans

Performance

- Maximum speed: 74 km/h (46 mph, 40 kn)
- Cruise speed: 56 km/h (35 mph, 30 kn) at 152 m (500 ft) minimum altitude
- Range: 33.7 km (20.9 mi, 18.2 nmi)
- Endurance: 30 minutes
- Service ceiling: 910 m (3,000 ft) AMSL
- Rate of climb: 2.0 m/s (400 ft/min)
- Disk loading: 320 kg/m^{2} (66 lb/sq ft)
- Power/mass: 0.467 kW/kg (0.284 hp/lb)

== See also ==
- SoloTrek XFV
- Backpack helicopter
- NASA Puffin
