= List of single seat helicopters =

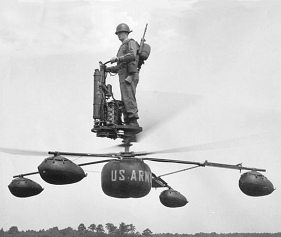
HZ-1 Aerocyle

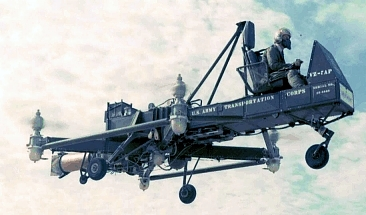
VZ-7

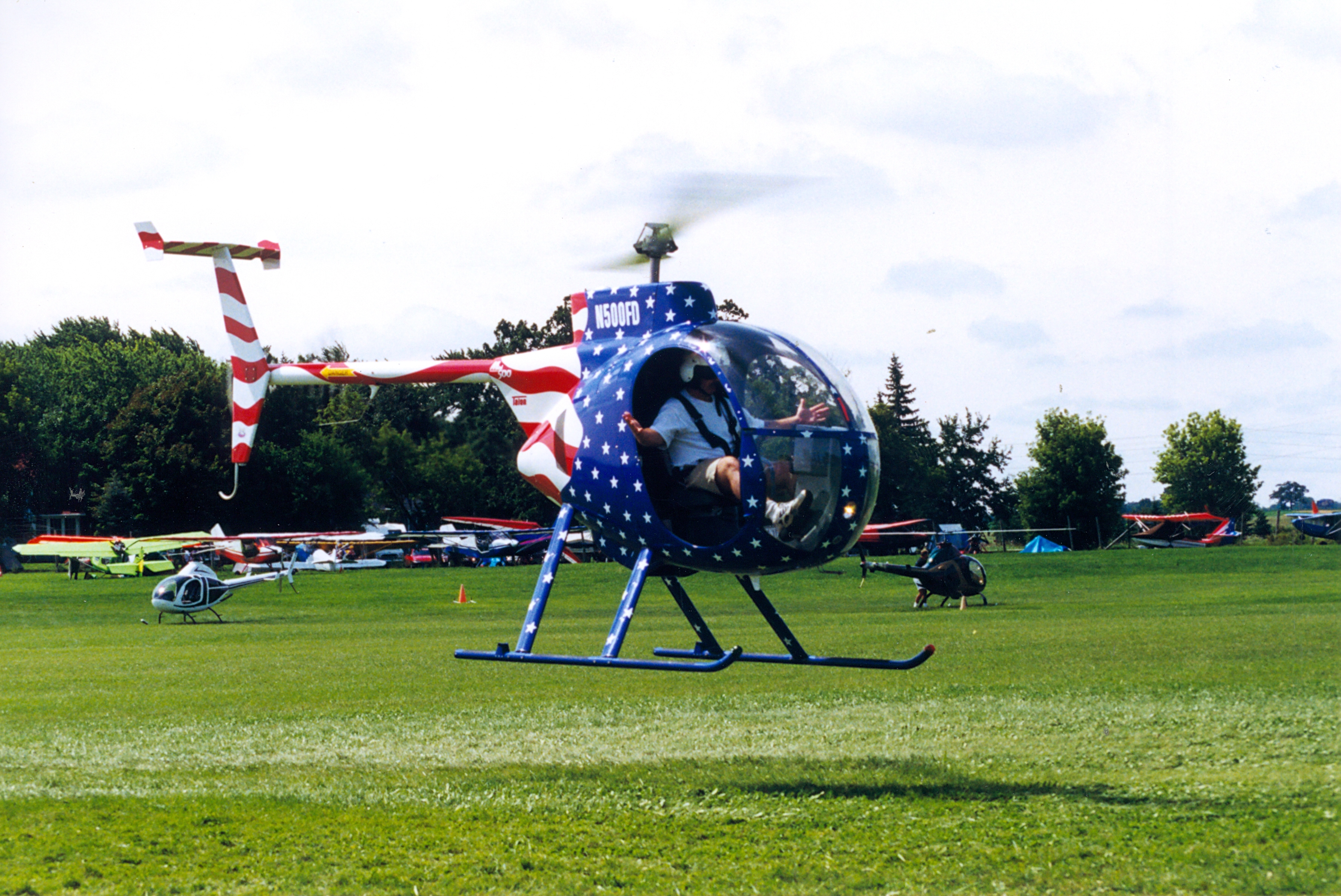
Mini 500

List of single seat helicopters is a list of helicopters with one seat. They may or may not be ultralight aircraft. Some single seat helicopters are evtols.

- Adams-Wilson Hobbycopter
- Adney Helicopter
- Airbus A³ Vahana (eVTOL)
- American Helicopter XH-26 Jet Jeep
- Baumgärtl Heliofly III
- Chrysler VZ-6
- Curtiss-Wright VZ-7
- De Lackner HZ-1 Aerocycle
- Eagle Helicycle
- Eagle's Perch
- Flettner Fl 282
- Gluhareff EMG-300
- Goodyear GA-400R Gizmo
- Gyrodyne RON Rotorcycle
- Heli-Sport CH-7
- Hiller VZ-1 Pawnee
- Hoppi-Copter
- Jetson One (eVTOL)
- Kamov Ka-50
- Kaman KSA-100 SAVER
- Lift Hexa (eVTOL)
- McDonnell XH-20 Little Henry
- MC ONE (eVTOL)
- Mosquito Aviation XE
- Nagler-Rolz NR 54
- PKZ-2
- Revolution Mini-500
- RYSE Recon (eVTOL)
- Hiller ROE Rotorcycle
- Vought-Sikorsky VS-300

== See also ==
- Flying platform
- List of ultralight helicopters
- List of most-produced rotorcraft
