= Beyond Verbal =

Israeli start-up company

- Company type: Private
- Website type: Biometrics
- Founded: 2012
- Headquarters: Tel Aviv, {{{location_country}}}

Beyond Verbal is an Israeli start-up company that has developed a tool for Emotion recognition using vocal intonation.

== Overview ==
Beyond Verbal commercializes patented technology from 18 years of research by physicists and neuropsychologists into the mechanisms of human intonations. The company says that its technology enables machines to understand human emotions by analyzing raw voice intonations as people speak.

== History ==
The company founders are Yoav Hoshen, Yuval Mor, Yuval Rabin and Ambassador Ned Siegel. Its technology was based on the research of Dr. Yoram Levanon, neuro-psychologist Dr. Lan Lossos and behavioral researcher Dr. Alon Goldstein. The idea for Beyond Verbal was inspired by observing how babies, who do not understand words, can sense their caretakers' emotions and attitudes towards them. After testing 60,000 subjects in 26 languages, the team developed a system called Emotion Analytics to extract, decode and measure human moods, attitudes and personalities.

== Milestones ==
- 04.2012: Founding of Beyond Verbal Communication, Ltd.
- 09.2012: Purchase of Key IP – Emotions Analytics technology, 17 years of research, 70,000 voices tagged in more than 30 languages, 3 patents
- 05.2013: First seed investment of $2.8M
- 06.2013: Launch of Moodies – Emotions Analytics web-based demo app
- 07.2013: Follow on investment of additional $1 million
- 09.2013: Launch of Emotions Analytics cloud-based API and first partner sign-up
- 12.2013: Launch of first third-party solution
- 01.2014: Launch of mobile Moodies iOS app
- 06.2014: Partnership With Lieberman Research Worldwide (LRW) to integrate Emotions Analytics technology to enhance market research.

== Investors ==
Beyond Verbal has received $10.8 million in funding. Investors include Singulariteam, Winnovation and The Siegel Group.
