= Solar Ship, Inc. =

Hybrid airship manufacturing company

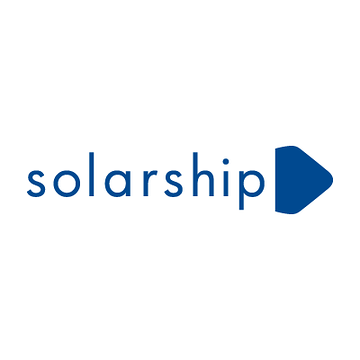
- Founded: Toronto, Canada (2006)
- Founder: Jay Godsall
- Headquarters: Toronto, Canada
- Key people: Jay Godsall, CEO; John Hutchinson, CTO; Michel Rugema, COO; Sébastien Fournier, CIO
- Products: Hybrid aircraft
- Owner: Jay Godsall
- Website: solarship.com

Solar Ship Inc. is a company based in Toronto, Ontario, Canada working to develop a hybrid aircraft to deliver critical cargo to cut-off places. The solarship gains lift from both buoyant gas and aerodynamics, and uses power from solar panels. The aircraft is a new concept of transport that does not rely on fossil fuels or ground infrastructure.

== History ==
The concept behind Solar Ship was based on airships and the Canadian bush plane, and was devised by Jay Godsall in 1983. In 2006, Solar Ship Inc. was officially established.

== Aircraft ==
The solarship's wing-ship design allows for extreme short takeoff and landing (XSTOL or eSTOL). Its design provides a large surface area for solar electric power, allowing long, self- sufficient range. Solarships can also be powered by traditional combustion when solar energy is unavailable. However, the goal is to develop a new mode of transportation that does not depend on fossil fuels, roads, or runways. The solarship can access areas where planes, trucks, ships, and airships cannot, delivering cargo to the places that are currently cut off from the benefits of the connected world. Each solar plane is designed and built to the requirements of a mission. Currently, there are three initial craft concepts designed for specific missions: the Caracal, the Wolverine, and the Nanuq. The small Caracal is designed for disaster relief cargoes of at least 200kg, with a range of at last 200km and the ability to take off and land "from a soccer field". The mid-size Wolverine is designed for "air trucking" on shorter routes (500km or more), with the ability to carry over 5000kg in a payload bay sized for a 20-foot intermodal container. The largest design, named Nanuq, is designed for large payloads of 30 tons or more, and a range of over 2000km. Solar Ship's active mission, as of December 2015, is Mission Burundi. As of January 2026, Godsall is working on test flight around the world, planned for 2027. The aircraft is called the Tsorocopter and can carry up to 12 tonnes at low speed.

== Incidents ==
On August 29, 2014, a prototype aircraft owned, designed, and operated by Solar Ship crashed during a test flight in a tobacco field near Brantford Airport, seriously injuring its two pilots, Mark Taylor and Mark Marshall. One of the pilots had to be cut out of the aircraft by rescuers. The incident resulted in the temporary closure of Brantford Airport.

== Gallery ==
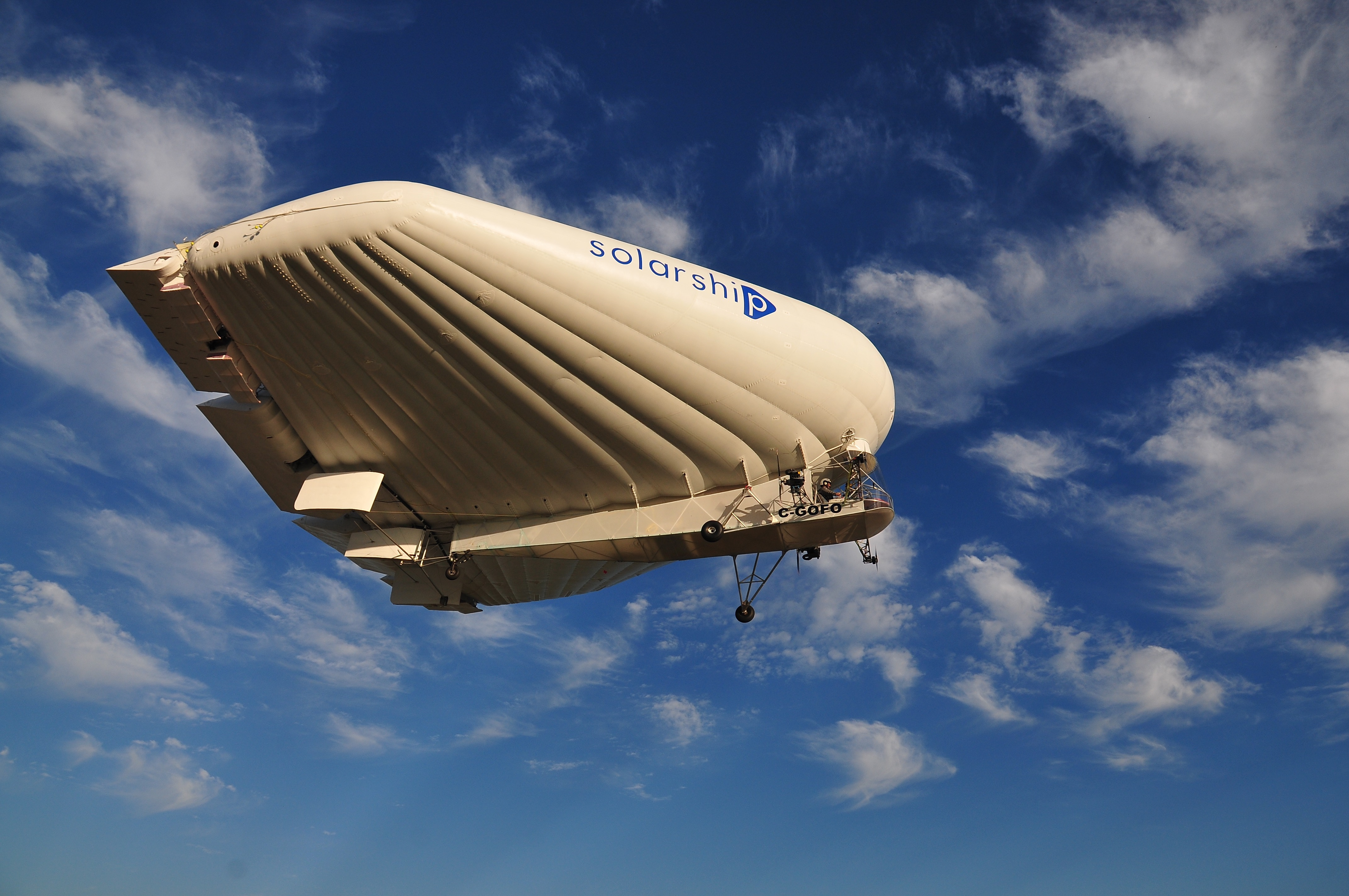
Side view

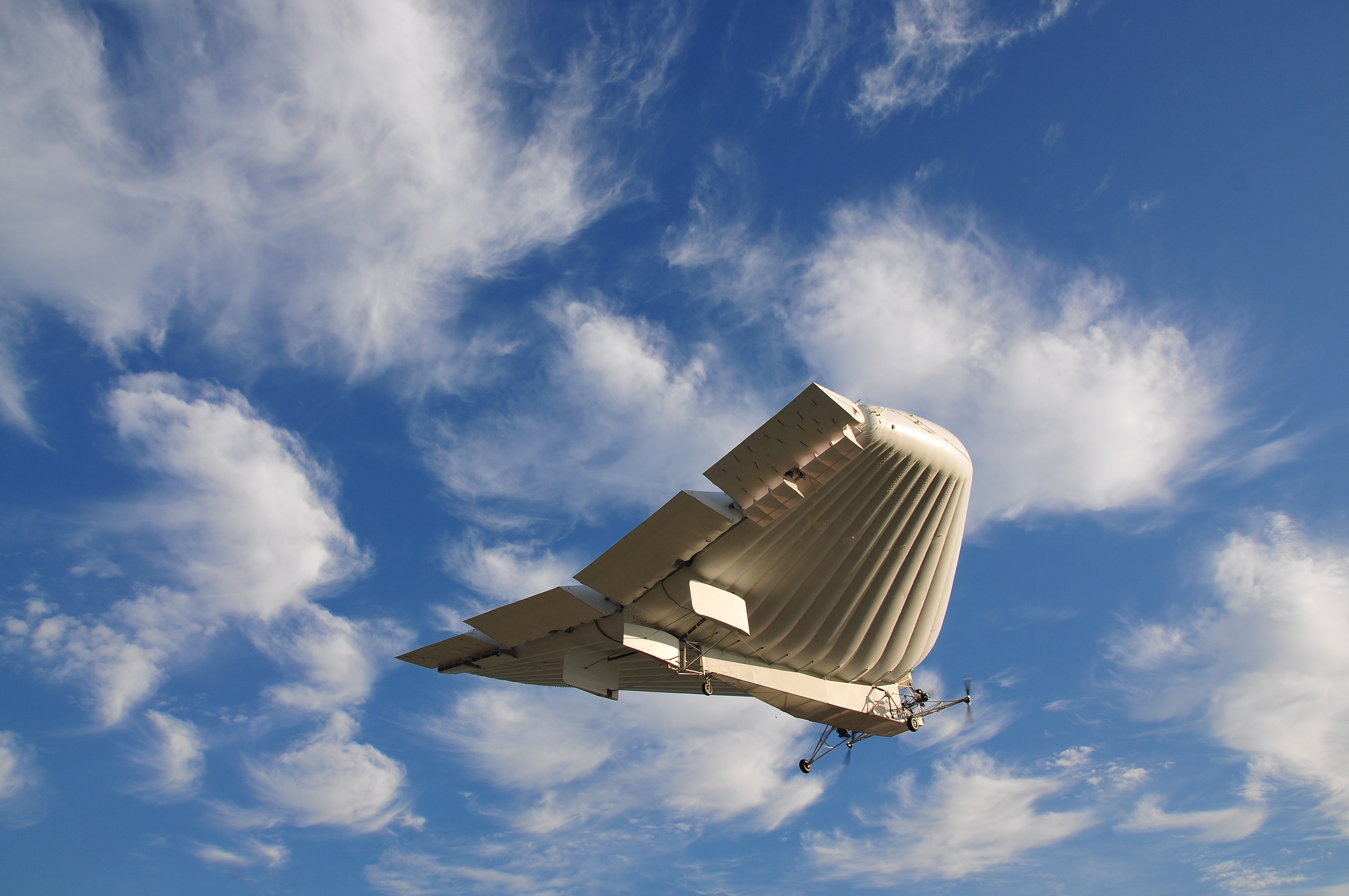
Rear view

== See also ==
- Solar Splash
