= Baumgärtl Heliofly III =

1940s experimental backpack helicopters

Heliofly III

General information
- Type: Experimental backpack helicopter
- National origin: Germany
- Manufacturer: Paul Baumgärtl
- Designer: Paul Baumgärtl
- Number built: 1

History
- First flight: 1942

The Baumgärtl Heliofly III/57 and Baumgärtl Heliofly III/59 were 1940s experimental backpack helicopters designed and built by the Austrian-designer Paul Baumgärtl. Following on from his earlier experiments with strap-on autogyros the Heliofly III/57 was powered by two 8 hp (6 kW) Argus As 8 piston engines each driving a single-blade of the contra-rotating rotors.

A problem with the supply of the As 8 engine forced a re-design to use one 16 hp (12 kW) engine, powering two rotors on a common co-axial shaft, with the engine driving one rotor directly and the other through gearing to overcome the torque effects.

== Specifications (16hp) ==
Data from The Illustrated Encyclopedia of Aircraft

General characteristics

- Crew: 1
- Length: 6.10 m (20 ft 0 in)
- Empty weight: 35 kg (77 lb)
- Gross weight: 120 kg (265 lb)
- Powerplant: 1 × unknown piston engine, 12 kW (16 hp)
- Main rotor diameter: 2 × 6.10 m (20 ft 0 in)

== See also ==
Related lists

- List of rotorcraft
- List of single seat helicopters
