= Kaman KSA-100 SAVER =

American aircraft-stowable gyroplane escape device

KSA-100 SAVER

General information
- Type: Aircraft-stowable gyroplane escape device
- National origin: United States
- Manufacturer: Kaman Aerospace Corporation
- Number built: 1

History
- First flight: 28 December 1971

The Kaman KSA-100 SAVER (Stowable Aircrew Vehicle Escape Rotorseat) is an American aircraft-stowable gyroplane escape device designed and built by the Kaman Aerospace Corporation for the United States Navy. Designed to be used in naval combat aircraft to deploy as part of the ejection sequence, only one was built and it did not enter service. It was the first jet-powered gyroplane.

== Design and development ==
The United States Navy Air Development Center awarded a number of contracts to aerospace companies to find a method for ejected aircrew to escape from the scene of the crash. Kaman proposed a turbofan powered gyroplane it called the Stowable Aircrew Vehicle Escape Rotorseat or SAVER. The SAVER was an aircraft ejection seat with a Williams WRC-19 turbofan engine and a two-bladed non-powered rotor attached to the seat structure, the blades being telescopic and folded into the seat during normal use. When the pilot ejected, the seat would leave the aircraft and a drogue parachute would slow the seat and deploy the blades within four seconds. After an additional two seconds, the turbofan would run up to full power and the seat would fly as a gyroplane. Kaman made over 1500 air drops to test the self-deploying rotor system and a full-scale un-powered SAVER was tested by NASA in the Ames Research Laboratory wind tunnel in 1970. For flight testing, the SAVER was equipped with a ground handling frame which was a tricycle landing gear and support frame as well as basic flight instrumentation. The SAVER first flew in a towed flight on 28 December 1971 and the following day made a free flight, although it was fitted with a 16 ft non-telescoping rotor. Fitted with the 14 ft telescopic rotor, it first flew 10 January 1972. The SAVER used a Williams WRC-19 turbofan which was too powerful for the seat but was available "off the shelf." The program was to test the seat unmanned in an air launch but the program was cancelled as the military did not think the idea was a viable proposition.

== Specifications ==
Data from Jane's All the World's Aircraft 1973–74

General characteristics

- Crew: one
- Empty weight: 444 lb (201 kg)
- Gross weight: 710 lb (322 kg)
- Powerplant: 1 × Williams WRC-19 turbofan engine , 430 lbf (1.9 kN) thrust
- Main rotor diameter: 14 ft 0 in (4.27 m)

Performance

- Maximum speed: 115 mph (185 km/h, 100 kn)
- Range: 57 mi (92 km, 50 nmi)

== See also ==
Related lists

- List of rotorcraft
- List of single seat helicopters
