= Hoppi-Copter =

1940s American backpack helicopter

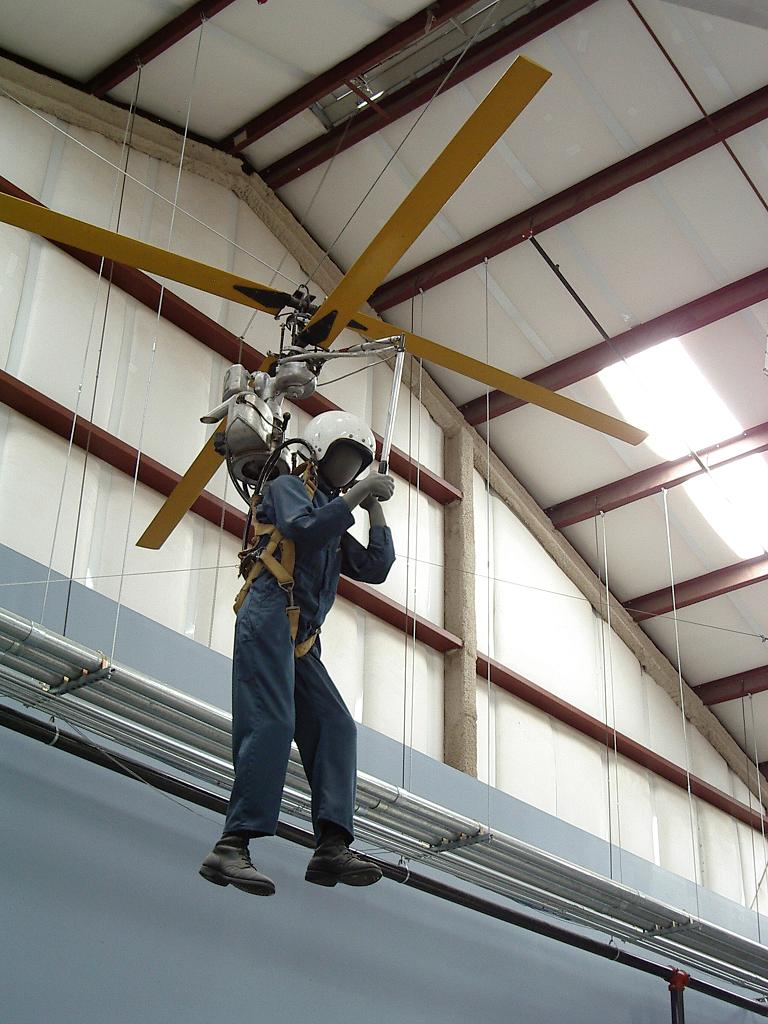
- Pentecost HX-1 Hoppi-Copter on display at Pima Air & Space Museum, in Arizona, U.S.

General information
- Type: Backpack helicopter
- National origin: United States
- Manufacturer: Hoppi-Copters Inc.

History
- First flight: c. 1940

The Hoppi-Copter was a functional backpack helicopter developed by the American company Hoppi-Copters Inc. founded by Horace T. Pentecost in the 1940s. The original Hoppi-Copter consisted of two contra-rotating rotors on a pole attached to a motorized backpack. Although it was capable of flight, it was extremely hard to control.

Later prototypes of the Hoppi-Copter included versions with the pilot in a sitting position, and were in effect miniature one-man helicopters of a more conventional design, though retaining the contra-rotating rotors and thus obviating a tail rotor. Despite interest from the British Ministry of Supply in the 102 and 104 models, none were adopted commercially.

== Variants ==
Pentecost HX-1 Hoppi-Copter (Hoppi-Copter 100)
original back-pack version.
Hoppi-Copter 101
equipped with a seat and landing gear, proved that more development was necessary.
Hoppi-Copter 102
framed, with seat for pilot.
Hoppi-Copter 103
as the 102, but lighter with a more powerful engine and slightly greater rotor diameter
Hoppi-Copter 104
as the 103, with even greater rotor diameter
Hoppi-Copter Firefly

== Specifications (Hoppi-Copter 102) ==
Data from Jane's All the World's Aircraft 1948

General characteristics

- Crew: One
- Empty weight: 173 lb (78 kg)
- Gross weight: 363 lb (165 kg)
- Powerplant: 1 × Unknown 750 cm^{3} (46 cu in) two stroke flat twin, 35 hp (26 kW) at 4,500 rpm; 9.1:1 reduction gearing to rotors
- Main rotor diameter: 2 × 16 ft (4.9 m)
- Main rotor area: 402 sq ft (37.3 m^{2}) total

Performance

- Maximum speed: 96 mph (154 km/h, 83 kn) all performance figures estimated
- Endurance: 1 hr at cruising speed
- Service ceiling: 12,000 ft (3,700 m) hover
- Disk loading: 1.8 lb/sq ft (8.8 kg/m^{2})

== See also ==
- Hiller YROE
- Gyrodyne RON Rotorcycle
- List of single seat helicopters
