= American Helicopter XH-26 Jet Jeep =

1952 experimental helicopter model

XH-26 Jet Jeep
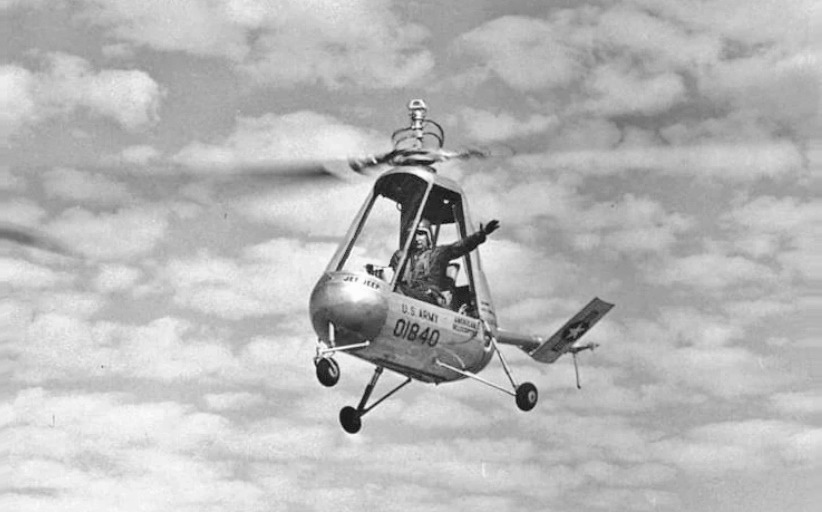

General information
- Type: Experimental observation helicopter
- National origin: United States
- Manufacturer: American Helicopter
- Primary users: United States Army United States Air Force
- Number built: 5

History
- First flight: January 1952

The American Helicopter XH-26 Jet Jeep (known as the XA-8 by its manufacturer) is an experimental tip jet helicopter developed in 1951 by the American Helicopter Company to meet a United States Army and Air Force (USAF) request for a collapsible and air-droppable observation helicopter.

A few prototypes were evaluated and flown during the 1950s, but it was decided not to adopt this type. Several examples have survived as museum pieces into the present day.

== Design and development ==
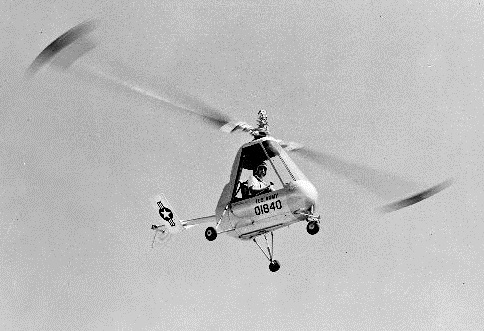
In flight

Design of the Model XA-8 began in 1951, following a specification for a one-man, collapsable helicopter that was capable of being assembled with simple tools; the intended roles of the aircraft were for observation and as an airdropped rescue vehicle. A contract for development was awarded in June 1951, and the prototype XH-26 flew in January 1952. The aircraft was made of aluminum with a fiberglass rear fuselage. It could be collapsed to fit inside a 5 by 5 by 14 feet (1.5 by 1.5 by 4.3 m) container, and when stripped down weighed less than 300 pounds (140 kg); two men could assemble the aircraft in 20 minutes. Power was provided by two XPJ49 pulsejets serving as tipjets; startup was by compressed air and the aircraft could take off within 30 seconds. The small tail rotor was used solely for directional control.

American Helicopter chose the name "Jet Jeep", because the XH-26 could be used like a Jeep, but in the air. It could be transported by a Jeep, and even used the same fuel. The XH-26 could be dropped by air and assembled and be ready for flight in 20 minutes.

== Operational history ==
Both the Army and USAF evaluated the five prototype Jet Jeeps. They proved to be rugged and durable vehicles with a top speed of 80 mph (130 km/h) and a ceiling of 7,000 feet (2,100 m). Unfortunately, the pulse jets produced an unacceptable amount of noise and the drag of the engines in the event of power loss would prevent safe landings by autorotation. For these two reasons the Army found the pulse jet helicopters unsuitable as it had those with ramjets. Finally, cost considerations forced the cancellation of the program. The replacement of the XH-26's pulse jets with ramjets was suggested but never undertaken; however, the Hiller YH-32 Hornet helicopter was built using blade tip ramjets.

== Operators ==
United States

- United States Air Force
- United States Army

== Surviving aircraft ==
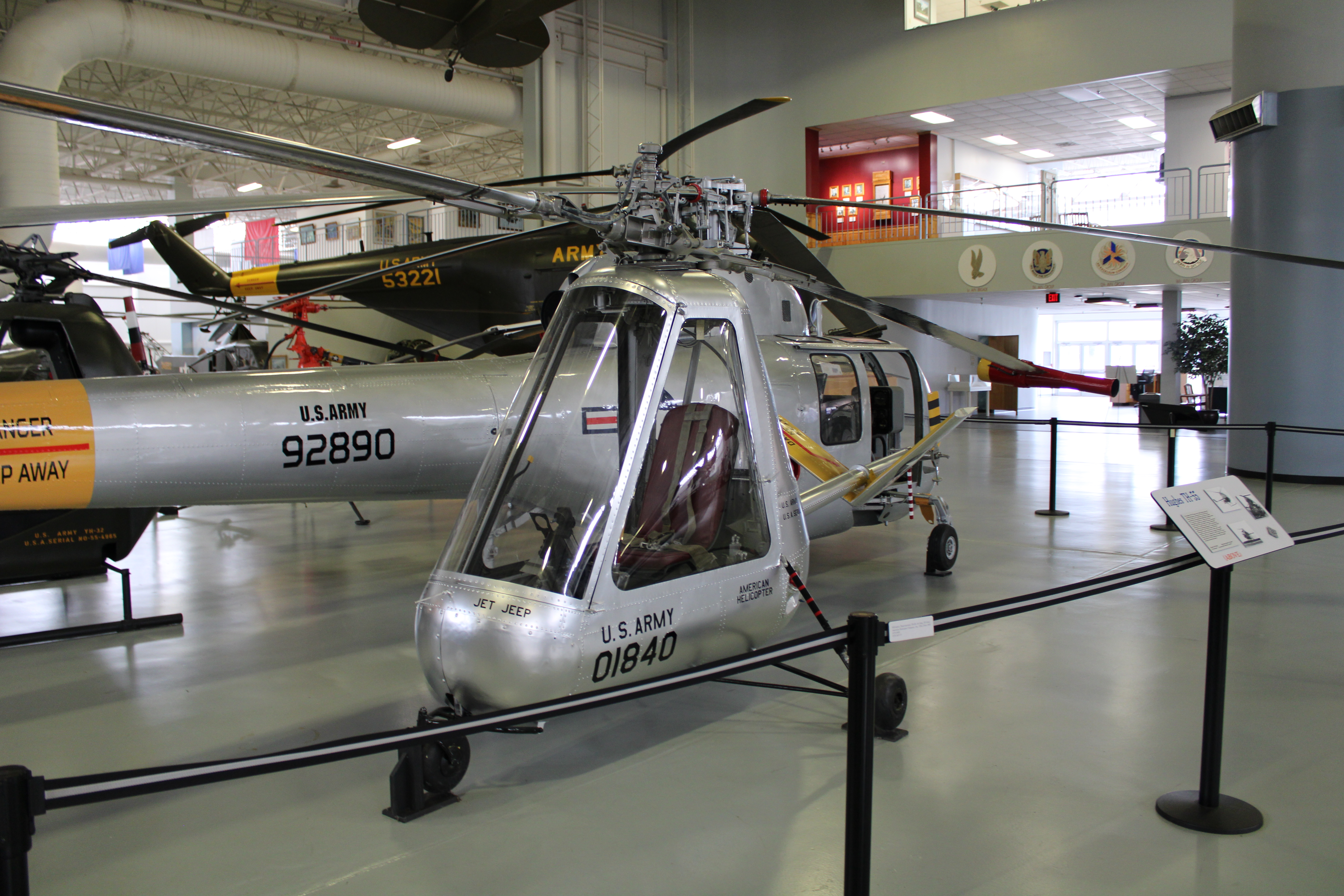
XH-26 at museum

- 50-1840 – XH-26 in storage at the United States Army Aviation Museum in Ozark, Alabama
- 50-1841 – XH-26 on static display at the National Museum of the United States Air Force in Dayton, Ohio.

== Specifications (XH-26) ==
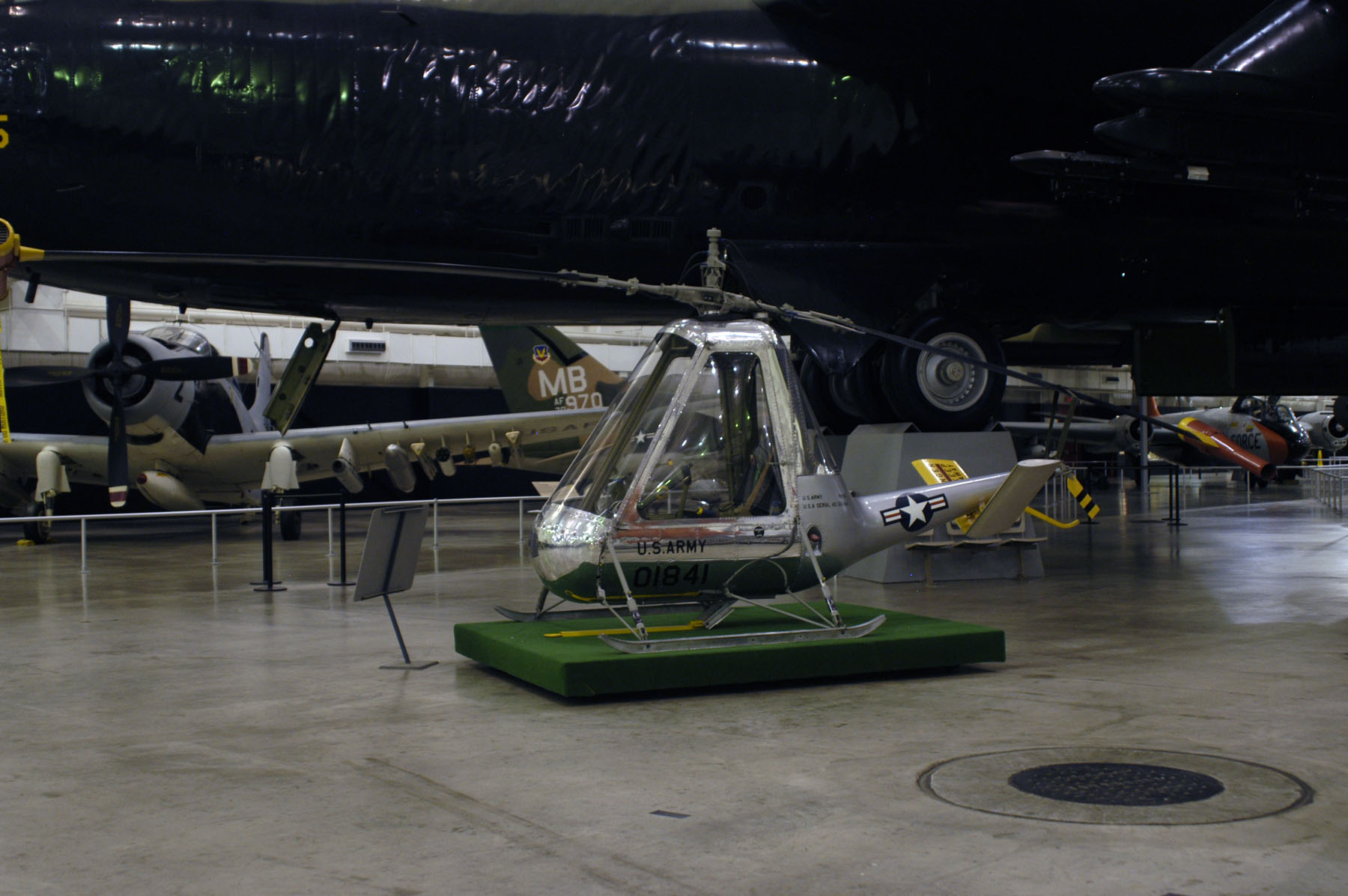
XH-26 in the National Museum of the United States Air Force

Data from The Illustrated Encyclopedia of Helicopters

General characteristics

- Crew: 1
- Length: 12 ft 0 in (3.73 m)
- Height: 6 ft 2 in (1.88 m)
- Empty weight: 298 lb (135 kg)
- Gross weight: 705 lb (320 kg)
- Powerplant: 2 × American Helicopter XPJ49-AH-3 pulsejet , 35 lbf (0.16 kN) thrust each
- Main rotor diameter: 27 ft 0 in (8.23 m)

Performance

- Maximum speed: 84 mph (135 km/h, 73 kn)
- Range: 104 mi (168 km, 90 nmi)
- Service ceiling: 7,000 ft (2,134 m)

== See also ==
Aircraft of comparable role, configuration, and era

- Hiller YH-32 Hornet
- Fairey Jet Gyrodyne
- Fairey Ultra-light Helicopter
- NHI H-3 Kolibrie

Related lists

- List of military aircraft of the United States
- List of single seat helicopters
