= Hiller ROE Rotorcycle =

1953 American single-person helicopter

Hiller ROE
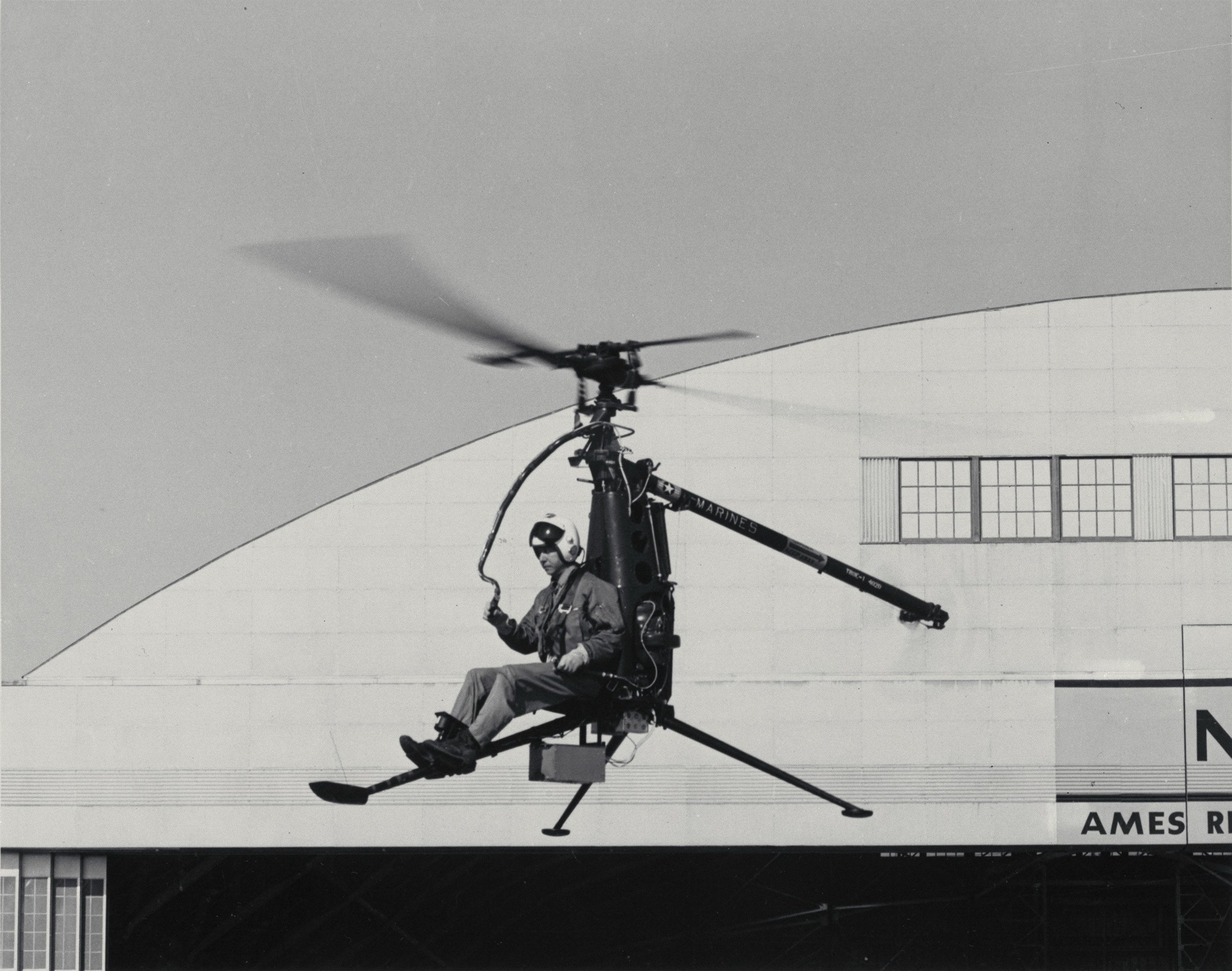
- A YROE-1 hovering in front of the Ames Hangar on 6 November 1963

General information
- Type: ultralight helicopter
- National origin: United States
- Manufacturer: Hiller Aircraft; Saunders-Roe
- Primary user: United States Marine Corps
- Number built: 12

History
- Introduction date: 1957
- First flight: November 1956
- Retired: 1961

The Hiller ROE Rotorcycle is a single-seat ultralight helicopter designed in 1953 for a military requirement. A total of 12 were produced for the United States Marine Corps. And in 1954, the Hiller Helicopters was selected by the US Navy's Bureau of Aeronautics to build this design of a one-man, foldable, self-rescue and observation helicopter. It featured a two-blade rotor system. Its original empty weight was 290 lb (132 kg).

== Development ==
The helicopter folded up and could be carried on a sled-like carrier by two people or could be air-dropped to pilots trapped behind enemy lines. The Marines did not accept the YROE due to its low performance, vulnerability to small-arms fire and the lack of visual references on the structure. This problem could cause the pilot to experience spatial disorientation at all but very low altitudes. The YROE or ROE never saw military service.

In 1954, the United States Navy′s Bureau of Aeronautics selected Hiller to build its proposed design of a one-man helicopter. The XROE Rotocycle completed flight testing in mid-1957.

It was demonstrated at the Pentagon in Arlington, Virginia, for military and other government officials in early April 1958.

Production was by Saunders-Roe, which made five for the United States Marine Corps and five for Helicop-Air of Paris.

A Porsche engine of 62 hp (46 kW) developed for the YROE completed trials by 1961.

== Variants ==
XROE-1
2 prototypes built as Model 1033 at the Hiller Helicopter Plant in Palo Alto, California
The first flight in November 1956
YROE-1
5 test versions built by British Saunders-Roe company
One donated to the Smithsonian Institution after completion of its testing in 1961
ROE-1
5 production built by Saunders-Roe (built ten production models, including the five YROE-1s)

== Specifications ==
Data from NASM : Hiller YROE-1 Rotorcycle, Jane's All the World's Aircraft 1958-59

General characteristics

- Crew: 1
- Length: 12 ft 6 in (3.81 m)
- Height: 7 ft 6 in (2.29 m)
- Empty weight: 309 lb (140 kg)
- Gross weight: 562 lb (255 kg)
- Fuel capacity: 2.5 US gal (2 imp gal; 9 L)
- Powerplant: 1 × Nelson H-63 4-cylinder air-cooled 2-stroke horizontally-opposed piston engine, 40 hp (30 kW)

(later 43 hp (32 kW) Nelson YO-65-2)

- Main rotor diameter: 18 ft 6 in (5.64 m)
- Main rotor area: 268.8 sq ft (24.97 m^{2}) 2-bladed main rotor
- Blade section: NACA 0015

Performance

- Maximum speed: 70 mph (110 km/h, 61 kn)
- Cruise speed: 52 mph (84 km/h, 45 kn)
- Range: 166 mi (267 km, 144 nmi) with 170 lb (77 kg) pilot and 86 lb (39 kg) of fuel
- Service ceiling: 13,200 ft (4,000 m)
- Hover ceiling IGE: 9,200 ft (2,804 m)
- Rate of climb: 1,160 ft/min (5.9 m/s)

== Survivors ==
- XROE-1, on display at Hiller Aviation Museum, San Carlos, California
- YROE-1, ser. no. 4021, on display at Hiller Aviation Museum
- YROE-1, on display at National Air and Space Museum, Washington, DC
- YROE-1, N4230U, ser. no. 4024, El Cajon, California
- YROE-1, N777MV, ser. no. 4020, Minicopter Inc., Saginaw, Texas
- YROE-1, third one in production on display at Evergreen Aviation Museum
- XROE-1, repainted in blue, powered by a Rotax 503 and renamed "fantacopter", in working order at Bois-la-Pierre, France.

== See also ==
- List of single seat helicopters

Aircraft of comparable role, configuration, and era

- Gyrodyne RON Rotorcycle
- Hiller CAMEL
- Hoppi-Copter
