= Bell 206 =

Utility helicopter family by Bell

Bell 206 JetRanger/LongRanger
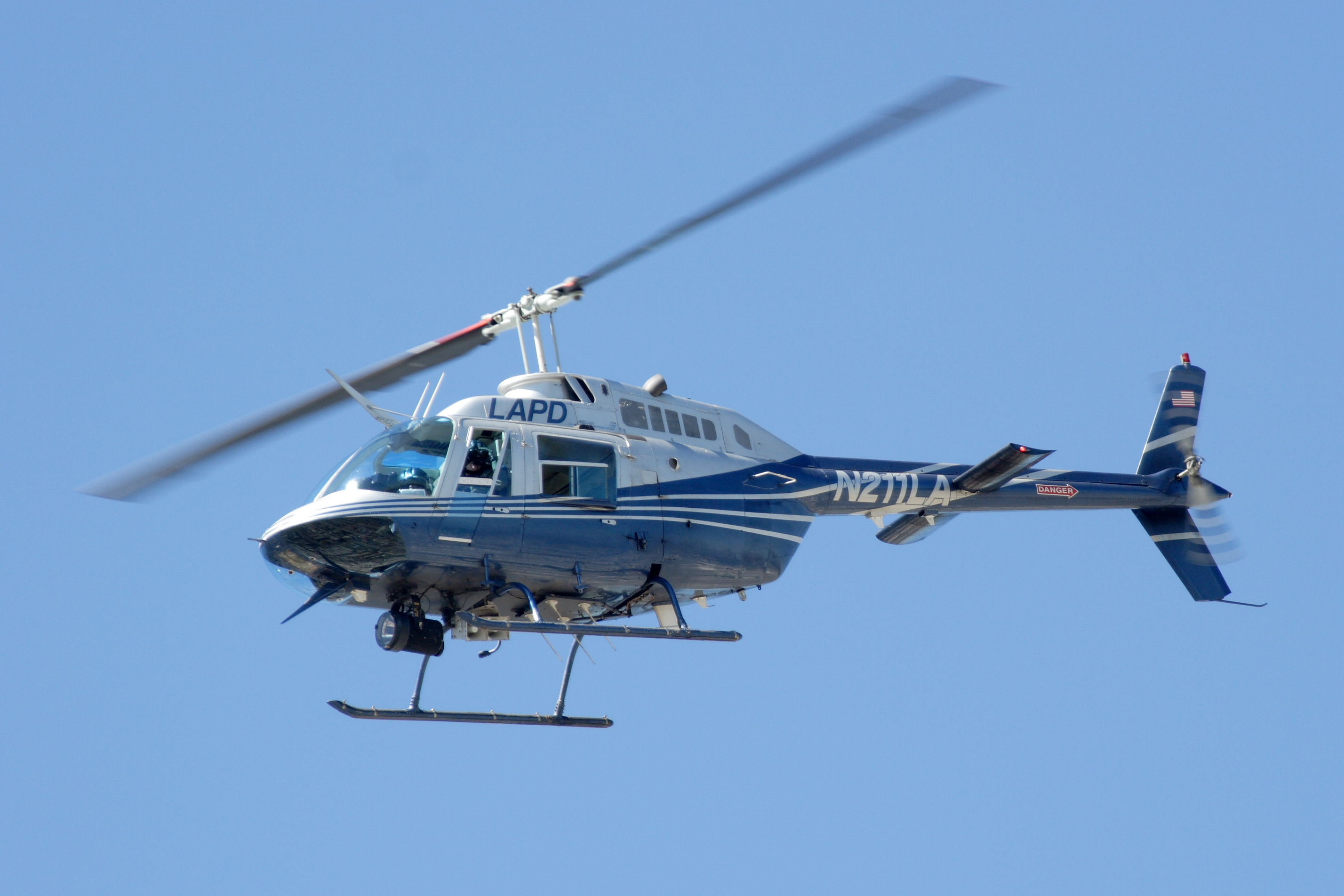
- An LAPD Bell 206 JetRanger

General information
- Type: Multipurpose utility helicopter
- National origin: United States / Canada
- Manufacturer: Bell Helicopter
- Status: In service
- Number built: 7,300

History
- Manufactured: 1962–2017
- Introduction date: 1967
- First flight: December 8, 1962 (206); January 10, 1966 (206A)
- Developed from: Bell YOH-4
- Variants: Bell OH-58 Kiowa; Bell 407
- Developed into: Bell 400 TwinRanger

The Bell 206 is a family of two-bladed, single- and twin-engined helicopters, manufactured by Bell Helicopter at its Mirabel, Quebec, plant. Originally developed as the Bell YOH-4 for the United States Army's Light Observation Helicopter program, it was not selected by the Army. Bell redesigned the airframe and successfully marketed the aircraft commercially as the five-place Bell 206A JetRanger. The new design was eventually selected by the Army as the OH-58 Kiowa.

Bell also developed a seven-place LongRanger, which was later offered with a twin-engined option as the TwinRanger, while Tridair Helicopters offers a similar conversion of the LongRanger called the Gemini ST. The ICAO-assigned model designation "B06" is used on flight plans for the JetRanger and LongRanger, and the designation "B06T" is used for the twin-engined TwinRangers.

== Development ==
=== Origins ===
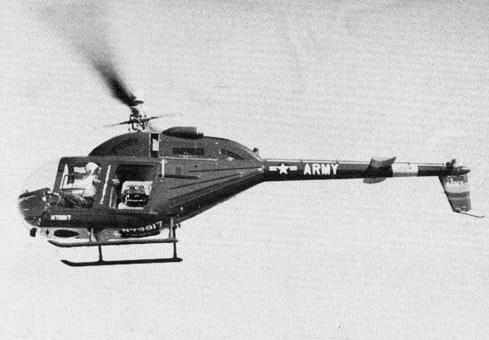
A YOH-4A LOH in flight

On October 14, 1960, the United States Navy solicited responses from 25 aircraft manufacturers to a request for proposals (RFP) on behalf of the Army for the Light Observation Helicopter (LOH). Bell entered the competition along with 12 other manufacturers, including Hiller Aircraft and Hughes Tool Co., Aircraft Division. Bell submitted the D-250 design, which would be designated as the YHO-4. On May 19, 1961, Bell and Hiller were announced as winners of the design competition.

Bell developed the D-250 design into the Bell 206, redesignated as YOH-4A in 1962, and produced five prototype aircraft for the Army's test and evaluation phase. The first prototype flew on December 8, 1962. The YOH-4A also came to be known as "The Ugly Duckling" in comparison to the other contenders. Following a fly-off of the Bell, Hughes and Fairchild-Hiller prototypes, the Hughes OH-6 was selected in May 1965.

=== JetRanger ===
When the YOH-4A was eliminated by the Army, Bell went about marketing the aircraft. In addition to the image problem, the helicopter lacked cargo space and only provided cramped seating for three passengers. The solution was a redesigned fuselage, sleeker and aesthetically appealing, adding 16 ft^{3} (0.45 m^{3}) of cargo space in the process. A Bell executive contributed to the redesign by drawing two lines on a sketch extending the fuselage to where it meets the tail. The redesign was designated Bell 206A, and Bell President Edwin J. Ducayet named it the JetRanger, denoting an evolution from the popular Model 47J Ranger.

Bell Helicopter ended production of the Bell 206B-3 version in 2010. In 2011, used 206B-3s sold for around $1.4 million depending upon equipment and configuration. Bell introduced the Bell 505 Jet Ranger X to replace the 206 five-seat versions from around 2015 and compete with the Robinson R66.

=== LongRanger ===
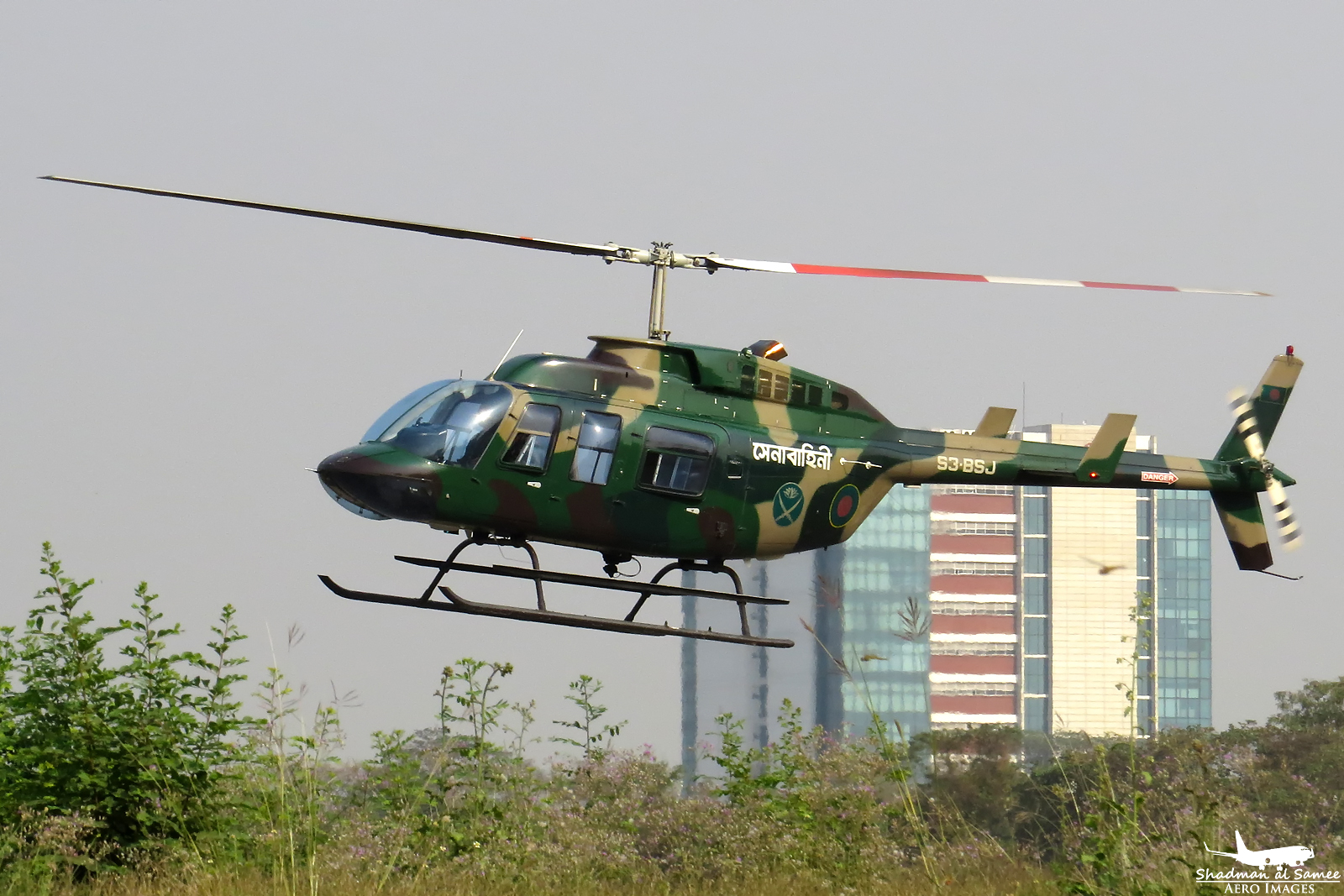
A Bell 206-L4 of the Bangladesh Army

The 206L LongRanger is a stretched variant with seating for seven. The fuselage, stretched a total of 30 inches (760 mm), adds two rear-facing seats between the front and rear seats. Since 1975, Bell has produced more than 1,700 LongRangers across all variants. In 1981, a military version, the 206L TexasRanger was released. The original 206L used an Allison 250-C20R engine, and a series of model upgrades replaced this engine with more powerful versions; the 206L-1 used a 250-C28, and the 206L-3 and 206L-4 used the 250-C30P.

In both applications, the 250-C30P is derated from 650 hp for takeoff and 501 hp continuous. The 206L-3 is transmission-limited to 435 hp for take-off, and the 206L-4 is transmission-limited to 495 hp. The derating of the C30P produces an advantage in hot-day and high-altitude operations, as it can produce the rated horsepower at higher altitudes and temperatures where applications that use the maximum rating of the engine at sea level suffer accelerated performance deterioration with increases in temperature and altitude. The 206L-3 and L-4 have not been offered in a twin configuration under those model designations.

In 2007, Bell announced an upgrade program for the 206L-1 and 206L-3 designed to modify the aircraft to the 206L-4 configuration; modified aircraft are designated 206L-1+ and 206L-3+. Modifications include strengthened structural components (including a new tailboom), improved transmission, upgraded engine for the L-1, all of which result in a maximum gross weight increase of 300 pounds and increased performance.

Production of the 206L-4 ended in June 2017 with over 3,800 LongRangers built.

=== Gemini ST and TwinRanger ===
The TwinRanger name dates from the mid-1980s when Bell developed the Bell 400 TwinRanger, but it never entered production.

In 1989, Tridair Helicopters began developing a twin-engine conversion of the LongRanger, the Gemini ST. The prototype's first flight was on January 16, 1991, while full FAA certification was awarded in November. Certification covers the conversion of LongRanger 206L-1s, L-3s and L-4s to Gemini ST configuration. In mid-1994 the Gemini ST was certificated as the first Single/Twin aircraft, allowing it to operate either as a single or twin engine aircraft throughout all phases of flight.

The Bell 206LT TwinRanger was a new-build production model equivalent to Tridair's Gemini ST, and was based on the 206L-4. Thirteen 206LTs were built, the first delivered in January 1994, and the last in 1997. The TwinRanger was replaced in Bell's lineup by the mostly-new Bell 427.

== Operational history ==
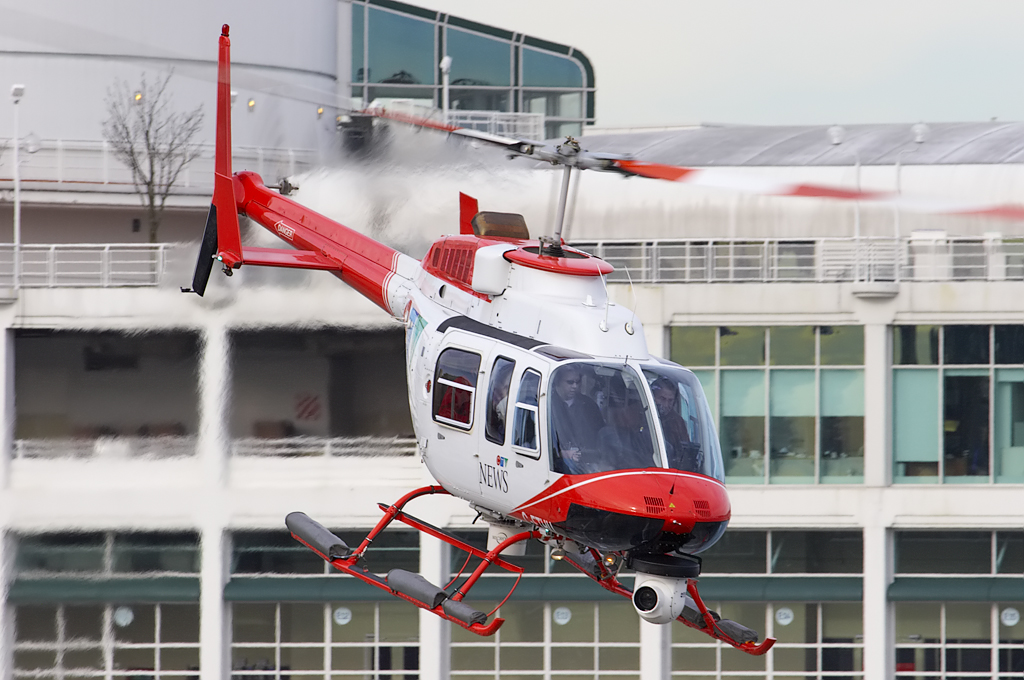
A Bell 206L-4 Long Ranger IV (operated by CTV British Columbia), departing Vancouver Harbour helipad

The first Bell 206A flew on January 10, 1966, and the aircraft was revealed later that month at the Helicopter Association of America (HAA) convention. On October 20, 1966, the JetRanger received FAA certification. Delivery of the JetRanger to customers began on January 13, 1967, with the first aircraft being purchased by Harry Holly, CEO of the Hollymatic Corporation and previous owner of a Bell Ranger. In 1968, the United States Navy selected the 206A as its primary trainer, the TH-57 Sea Ranger. The Army also eventually selected the 206A for a light observation helicopter as the OH-58 Kiowa.

The basic shape and design of the JetRanger remained unchanged since 1967, but Bell introduced the 206B JetRanger II in 1971. In 1977, the 206B-3 JetRanger III was introduced with its modified tail rotor and more powerful engine. The JetRanger is popular with news media for traffic and news reporting. The LongRanger is commonly used as an air ambulance and as a corporate transport. On September 1, 1982, pilots H. Ross Perot, Jr. and Jay Coburn departed Dallas, Texas in the "Spirit of Texas", a Bell 206L-1 (N3911Z). They returned on 30 September, 29 days and 3 hours later, completing the first around-the-world helicopter flight.

The Bell 206B was first introduced to the Canadian market shortly after its certification in 1967. Its early adoption was driven by the booming resource industries of the time, particularly in oil and gas exploration, mining, and forestry. Its light weight, combined with the ability to land in rugged, remote locations, made it an ideal tool for transporting geologists, surveyors, and equipment to otherwise inaccessible areas of Canada's vast wilderness.

In the 1970s and 1980s, the JetRanger became a critical part of exploration in northern Canada, including the Yukon, Northwest Territories, and Arctic regions, where harsh weather conditions and rough terrain demanded a helicopter that could perform in all environments. The Bell 206B's durability and low operating cost also made it a favorite for these long, sometimes dangerous missions.

In 1983, Australian businessman Dick Smith became the first helicopter pilot to complete a solo trip around the world in 260 flight hours. During the trip, he landed his 206B-3 (S/N 3653; VH-DIK) on prepositioned container ships to refuel between Japan and the Aleutian Islands.

In 1993, the U.S. Army chose the Bell 206B-3 as the winner of the New Training Helicopter competition, to serve as its primary training helicopter, the TH-67 Creek. The number of TH-67s being divested by the Army is too small to impact civilian markets.

On July 22, 1994, Ron Bower landed his 206B-3 (N206AJ) at Hurst, Texas, setting a new record for around-the-world flight by a helicopter. Bower had departed on June 24 and returned 24 days, 4 hours, 36 minutes and 24 seconds later, averaging 35.62 knots (40.99 mph; 65.97 km/h). Bower had added a 91-US-gallon (340 L) auxiliary fuel tank, which doubled the JetRanger III's range.

== Variants ==
=== Civilian ===
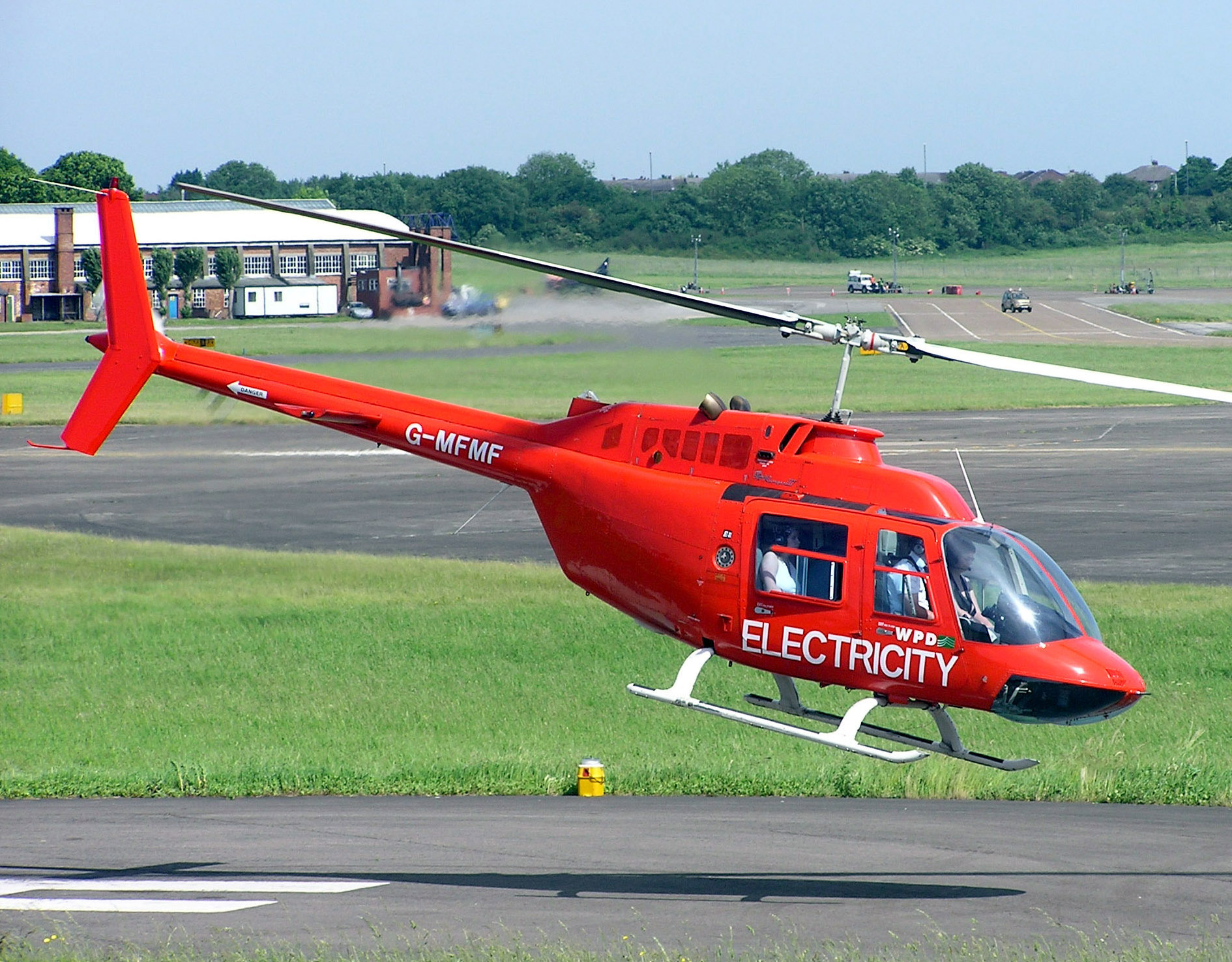
Bell 206B Jet Ranger III at Filton Airfield, Bristol, England. Used for electricity pylon patrols.

Bell 206
Five YOH-4A prototypes, for flight evaluation in the Army's LOH program (1963).
Bell 206A
Initial production version, powered by an Allison 250-C18 turboshaft engine. FAA-certified in 1966. Selected as the OH-58A Kiowa in 1968.
Agusta-Bell 206A
License-built in Italy.
Bell 206A-1
OH-58A aircraft that are modified for FAA civil certification.
Agusta-Bell 206A-1
License-built in Italy.
Bell 206B
Upgraded Allison 250-C20 engine.
Agusta-Bell 206B
License-built in Italy.
Bell 206B-2
Bell 206B models upgraded with Bell 206B-3 improvements.

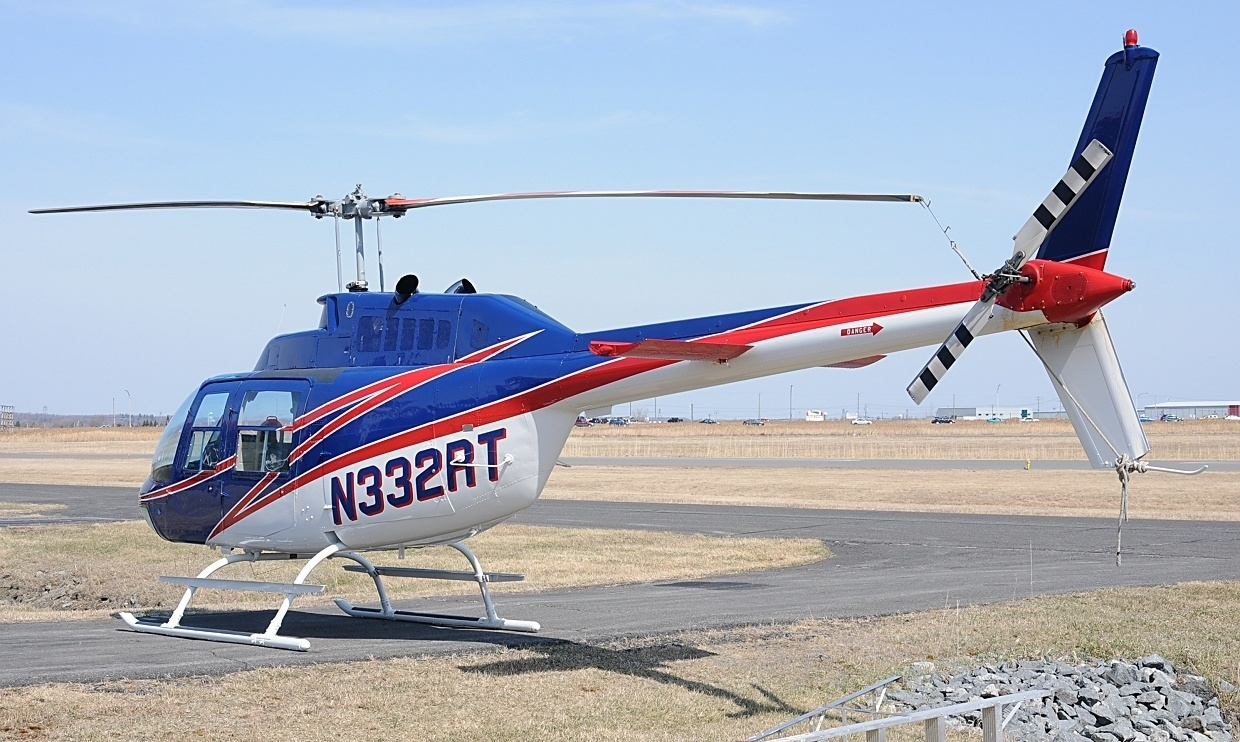
Bell 206B JetRanger tail end

Bell 206B-3
Upgraded Allison 250-C20J engine and added 2 inches (51 mm) to tail rotor diameter for yaw control.
Bell 206L LongRanger
Stretched, seven-seat configuration, powered by an Allison 250-C20B turboshaft engine.
Bell 206L-1 LongRanger II
Higher-powered version, powered by an Allison 250-C28 turboshaft engine.
Bell 206L-1+ LongRanger
Bell modifications, including 250-C30P engine, to upgrade aircraft to 206L-4 configuration.
Bell 206L-3 LongRanger III
Powered by an Allison 250-C30P turboshaft engine.
Bell 206L-3+ LongRanger
Bell modifications to upgrade aircraft to 206L-4 configuration.
Bell 206L-4 LongRanger IV
Improved version, 250-C30P engine and transmission upgrade.
Bell 206LT TwinRanger
Twin-engined conversions and new-builds of the 206L; replaced by the Bell 427.

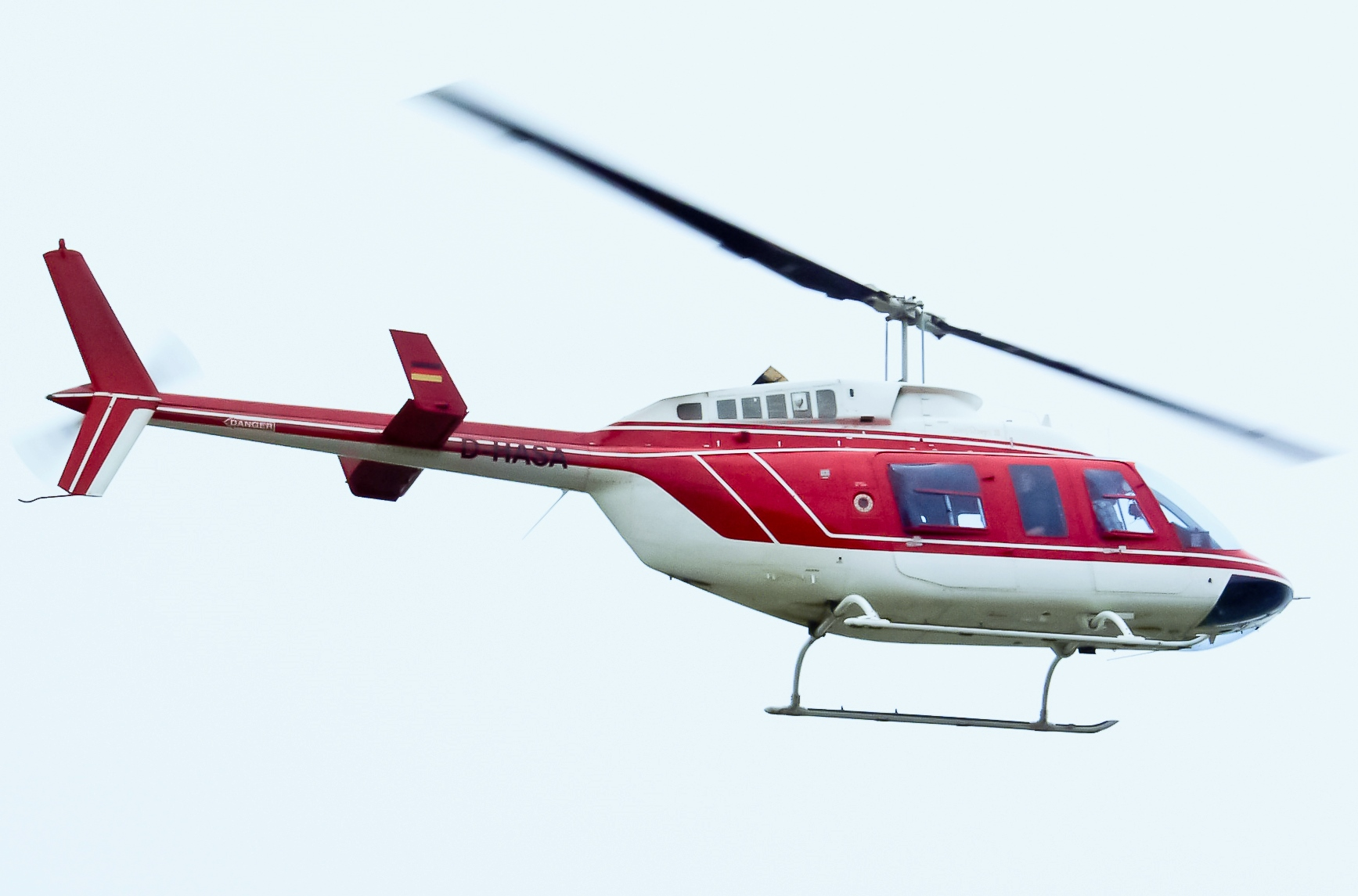
A Bell 206L-3

Bell 407
based on the 206L with four-blade rotor system.
Bell 417
upgraded 407 with larger engine; project canceled.
Cardoen Cb 206L-III
Chilean modified LongRanger III with narrow forward fuselage and flat-plate cockpit windows. At least two converted, with first flight in 1989.
HESA Shahed 278
An Iranian re-hash of Bell 206 components.
Aurora Flight Sciences Tactical Autonomous Aerial Logistics System test platform

=== Military ===
Bell 206AS
Export version for the Chilean Navy.

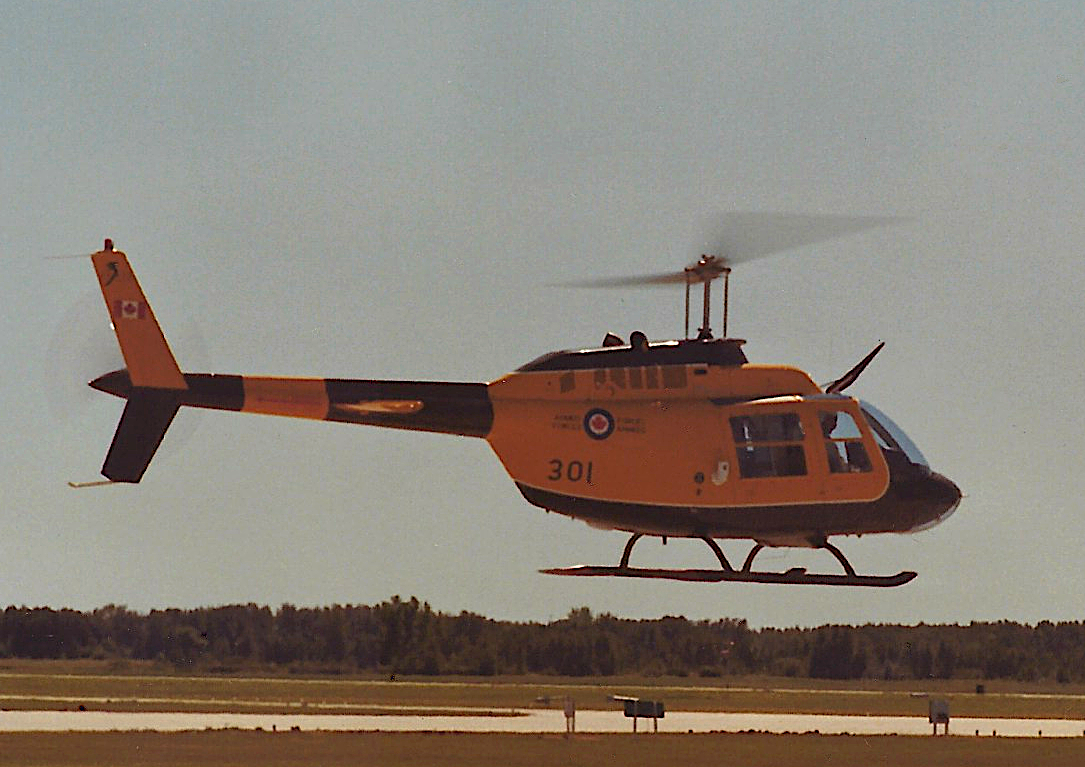
Canadian Armed Forces Bell CH-139 Jet Ranger

Bell CH-139 JetRanger
Canadian military designation for the Bell 206B-3.
Hkp 6A
Swedish Army designation for the Agusta-Bell 206A. 21 units manufactured in Italy, used as training, liaison, light transport, scout and anti-tank helicopters armed with ATGMs.
Hkp 6B
Swedish Navy designation for the Agusta-Bell 206A. 10 units manufactured in Italy, used as anti-submarine helicopters, armed with depth charges. This variant was equipped with emergency inflatable floats.
Hkp 6C
Sweden operated 32 Agusta-built 206A JetRangers as the Hkp 6A (Army) and Hkp 6B (Navy). One additional JetRanger was supplied to Sweden as the Hkp 6C (serial 06593). This was a Bell 206B-2 JetRanger III, belonging to the Försökscentralen (Trial Establishment). Like the others, the Hkp 6C was fitted with a 400 shp Allison 250-C20B turboshaft engine, designated the TAM 4B in Sweden, but had a different engine control system. It later went into civilian use as SE-HON.
OH-58 Kiowa
Light observation helicopter that replaced the OH-6A Cayuse.
TH-57A Sea Ranger
40 commercial Bell 206A aircraft purchased as the primary U.S. Navy helicopter trainer in January 1968 for training prospective U.S. Navy, U.S. Marine Corps, U.S. Coast Guard and select NATO/Allied helicopter pilots.

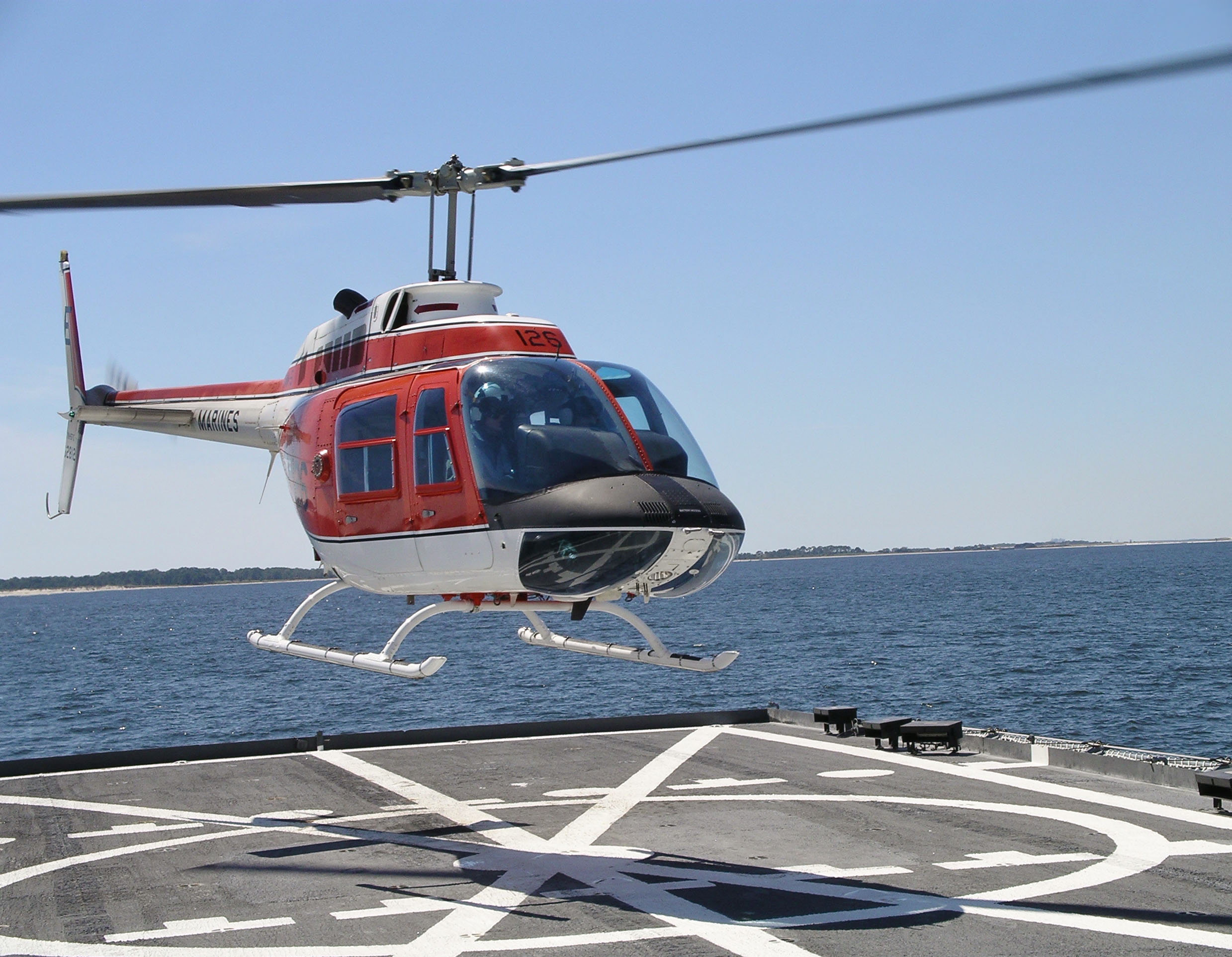
US Navy TH-57C Sea Ranger

206L TexasRanger
proposed export military version. One demonstrator was built (1981).
TH-57B
45 commercial Bell 206B-3 helicopters purchased by the US Navy in 1989 as replacements for the TH-57A for primary training under visual flight rules.
TH-57C Sea Ranger
71 commercial Bell 206B-3 helicopters purchased by the US Navy beginning prior to 1985 with cockpits configured for advanced training under instrument flight rules.
TH-57D
Planned upgrade program to convert 128 US Navy TH-57B and TH-57C aircraft to a single standard digital cockpit. Ultimately, only two Sea Rangers were upgraded to the TH-57D configuration before the program was cancelled in 2012. Both TH-57Ds were placed in storage at Davis-Monthan Air Force Base (AFB), Arizona, in mid-2013.
TH-67 Creek
137 commercial Bell 206B-3s purchased in 1993 as the primary and instrument helicopter trainer for the US Army at Fort Rucker, Alabama. 35 in VFR configuration and 102 in IFR configuration. The US Army has 181 units as of 2026, of which 121 are in VFR configuration and 60 are in IFR configuration. All TH-67s display US registrations ("N" numbers) and are operated as public use aircraft.
OH-4
Brazilian Air Force designation for an observation variant of the Model 206B-3. Originally designated LH-4.
VH-4
Brazilian Air Force designation for a VIP transport variant of the Model 206B-3.
HU-6
Brazilian Navy designation for a utility variant of the Model 206B-3.
IH-6/IH-6A/IH-6B
Brazilian Navy designations for trainer variants of the Model 206B-3. The IH-6 and IH-6A were originally designated HI-6 and HI-6A, respectively.
H.8
(Thai: ฮ.๘) Royal Thai Armed Forces designation for the Model 206B-3.
H.PhT.1
(Thai: ฮ.ผฑ.๑) Royal Thai Armed Forces designation for the Model 206B-2 used for aerial survey.

== Operators ==
List of military operators of the Bell 206. Current users in blue and former users in red.

The Bell 206 has been popular for all types of uses both commercial and private.

=== Military and government ===
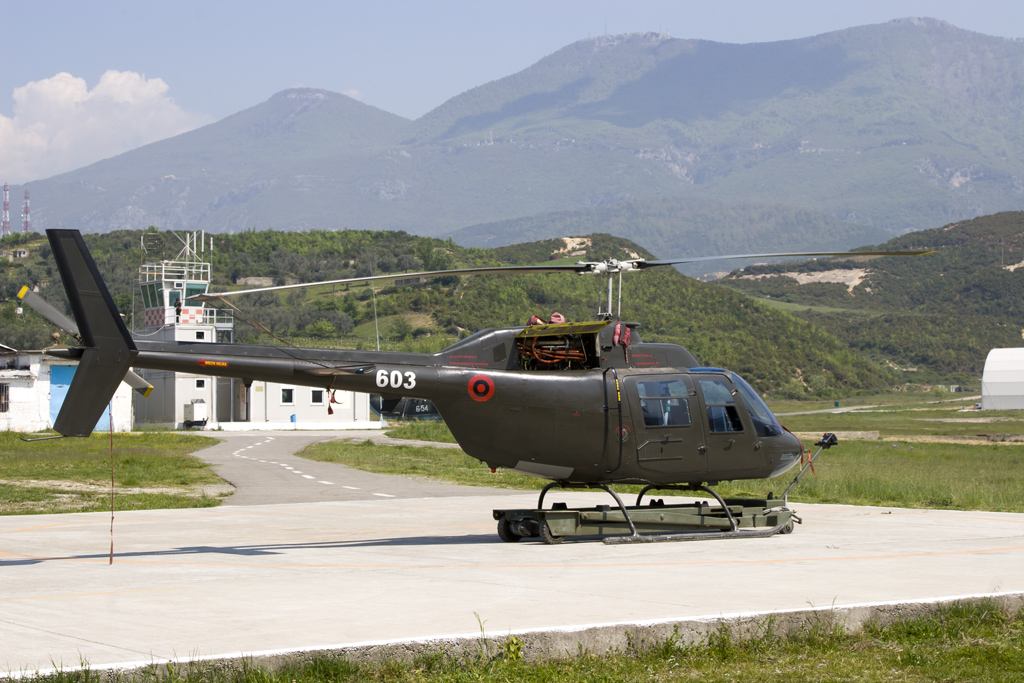
An Albanian Air Force AB206 at Farke airbase

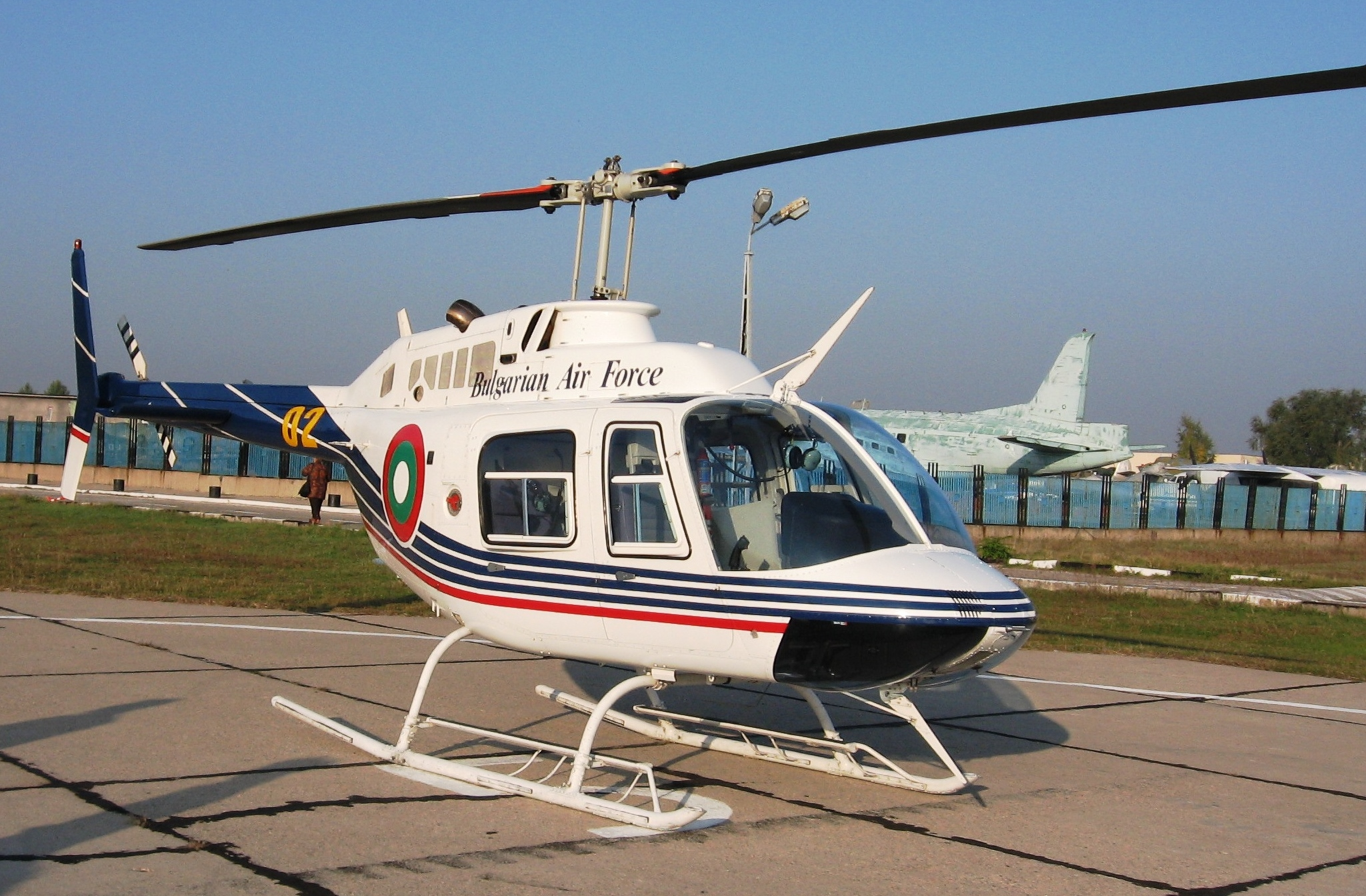
Bulgarian Air Force Bell 206

Albania

- Albanian Air Force

Argentina

- Argentine Army Aviation

Bangladesh

- Bangladesh Air Force
- Bangladesh Army

Brazil

- Brazilian Air Force
- Brazilian Navy

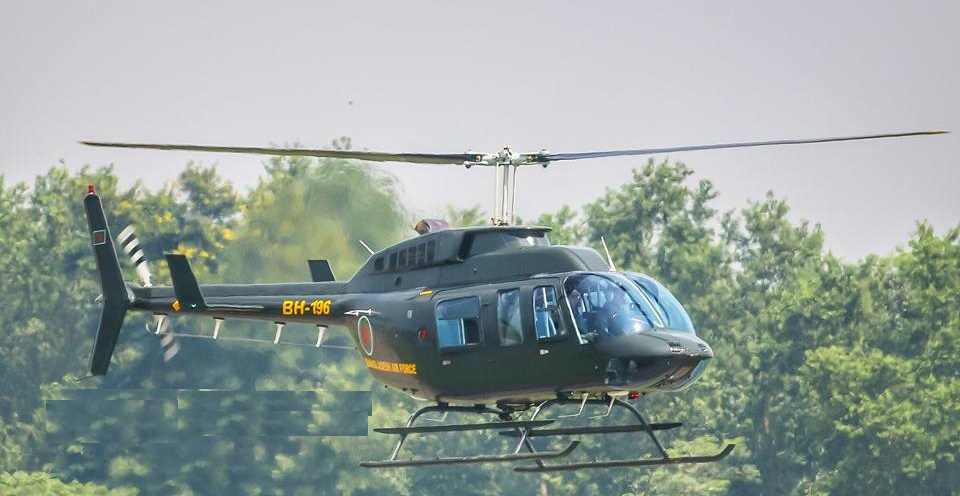
Bangladesh Air Force Bell 206

Bulgaria

- Bulgarian Air Force

Brunei

- Royal Brunei Air Force

Cameroon

- Cameroon Air Force

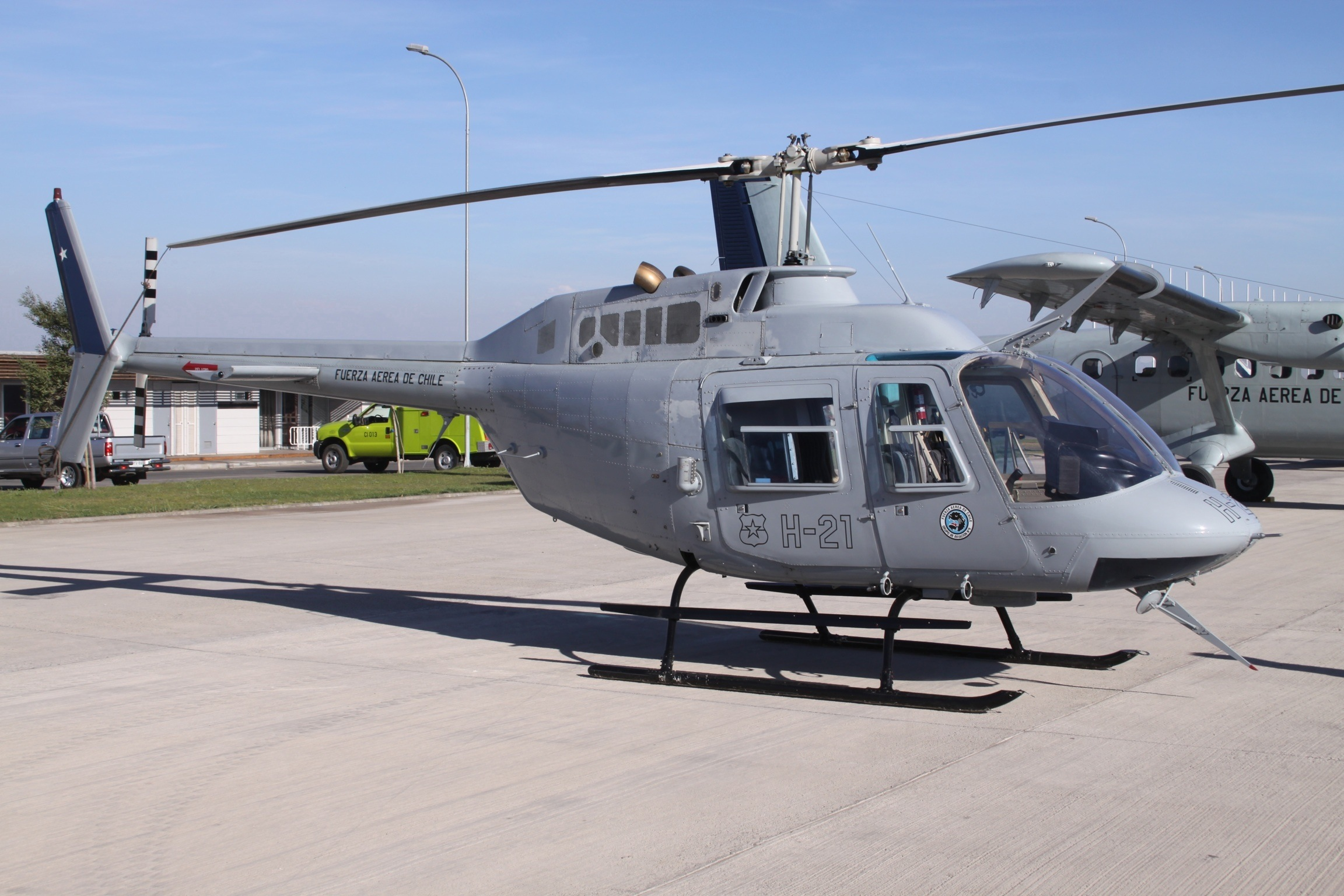
Chilean Air Force Bell 206

Chile

- Chilean Air Force
- Chilean Navy

Colombia

- Colombian Aerospace Force
- National Police of Colombia

Democratic Republic of the Congo

- Air Force of the Democratic Republic of the Congo

Croatia

- Croatian Air Force
- Croatian Police

Cyprus

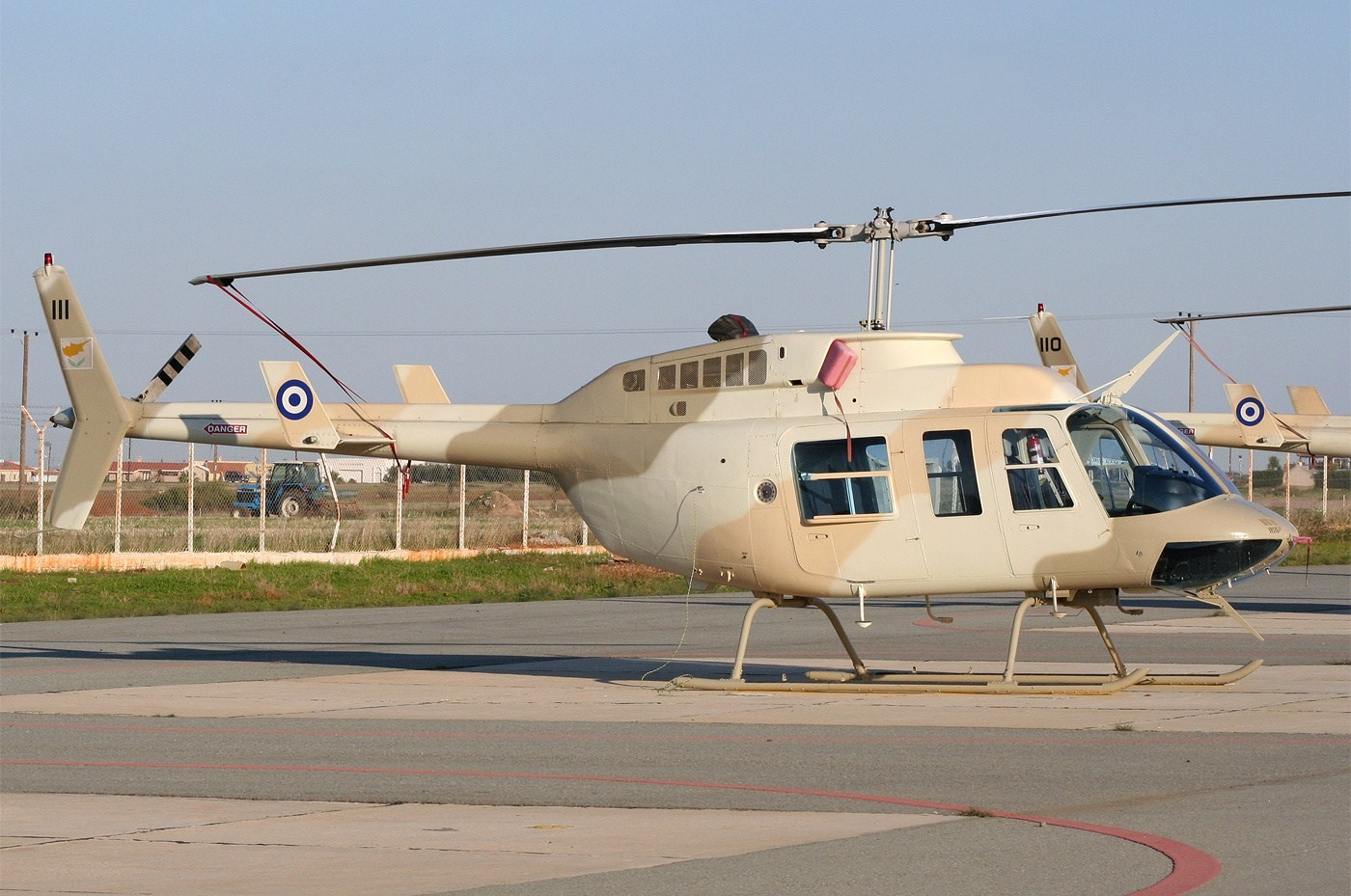
A Bell 206L-3 LongRanger of the Cyprus Air Command

- Cyprus Air Command

Dominican Republic

- Dominican Republic Air Force

Ecuador

- Ecuadorian Air Force
- Ecuadorian Navy

Finland

- Finnish Border Guard

Greece

- Greek Army

Guatemala

- Guatemalan Air Force

Guyana

- Guyana Defence Force

Iran

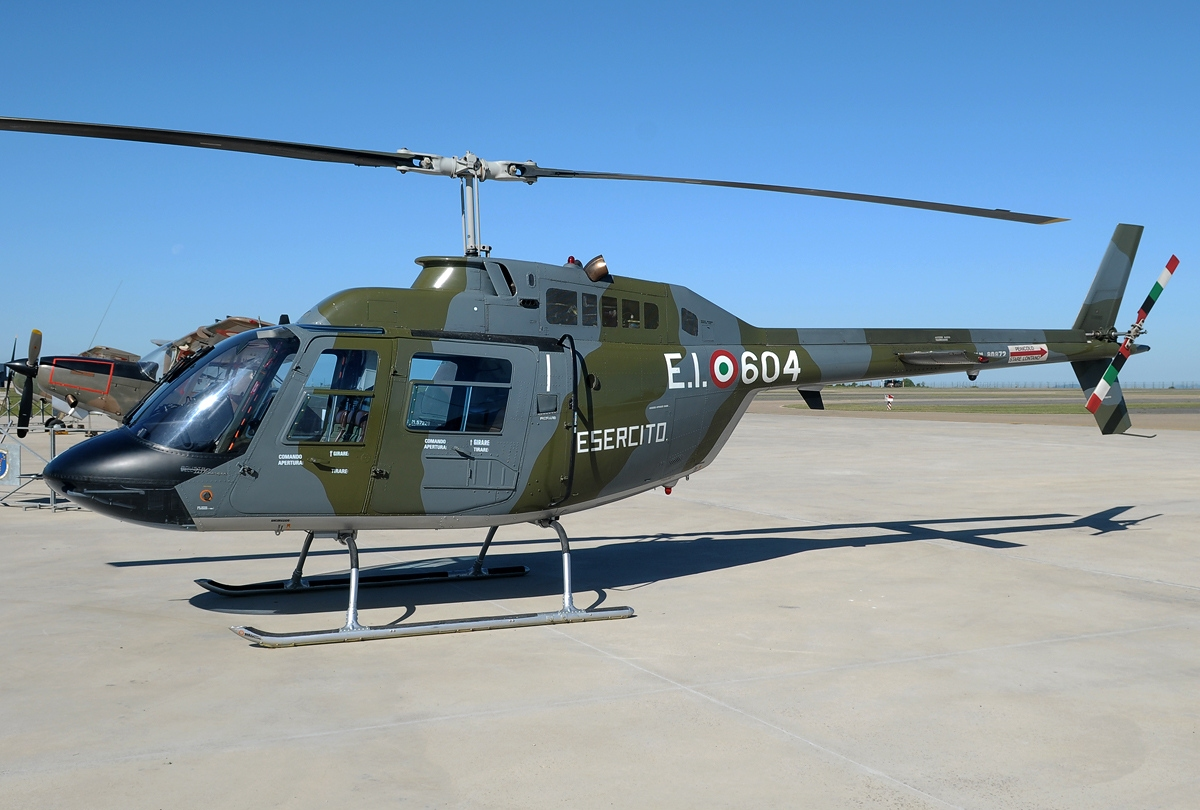
An Italian Army Agusta-Bell 206

- Islamic Republic of Iran Air Force
- Islamic Republic of Iran Army

Iraq

- Iraqi Air Force

Israel

- Israeli Air Force

Italy

- Italian Army
- Vigili del Fuoco
- Polizia di Stato

Jamaica

- Jamaica Defence Force

Japan

- Japan Coast Guard

Latvia

- Latvian State Border Guard

Lesotho

- Lesotho Defence Force

North Macedonia

- North Macedonia Air Brigade

Mexico

- Mexican Air Force

Morocco

- Royal Moroccan Air Force

Oman

- Royal Air Force of Oman

Pakistan

- Pakistan Army

Peru

- Peruvian Navy

Poland

- Polish Police

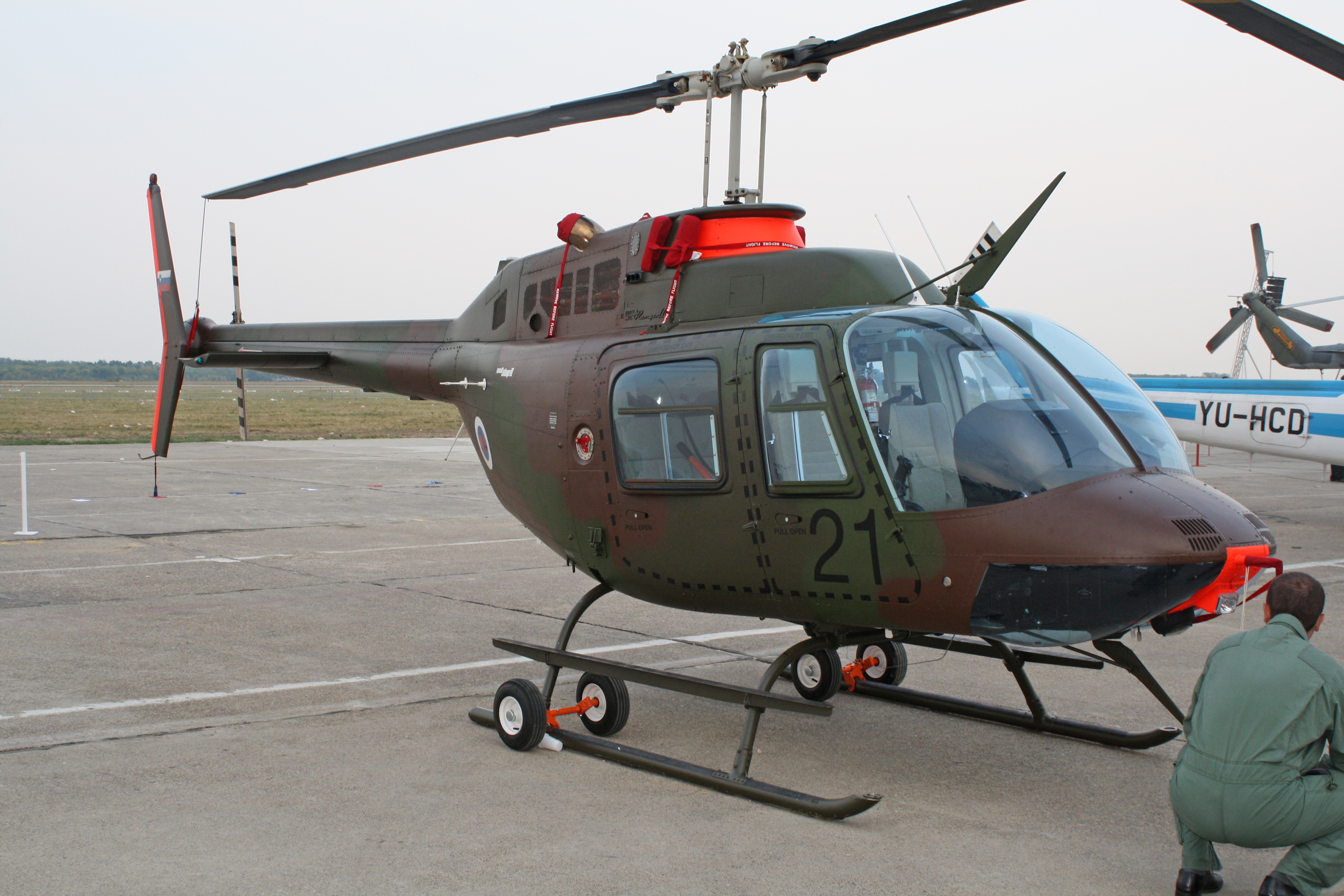
Slovenian Air Force and Air Defence Bell 206

Slovenia

- Slovenian Air Force and Air Defence

Sri Lanka

- Sri Lanka Air Force

Republic of China (Taiwan)

- Republic of China Army

Thailand

- Royal Thai Army
- Royal Thai Police

Turkey

- Turkish Army

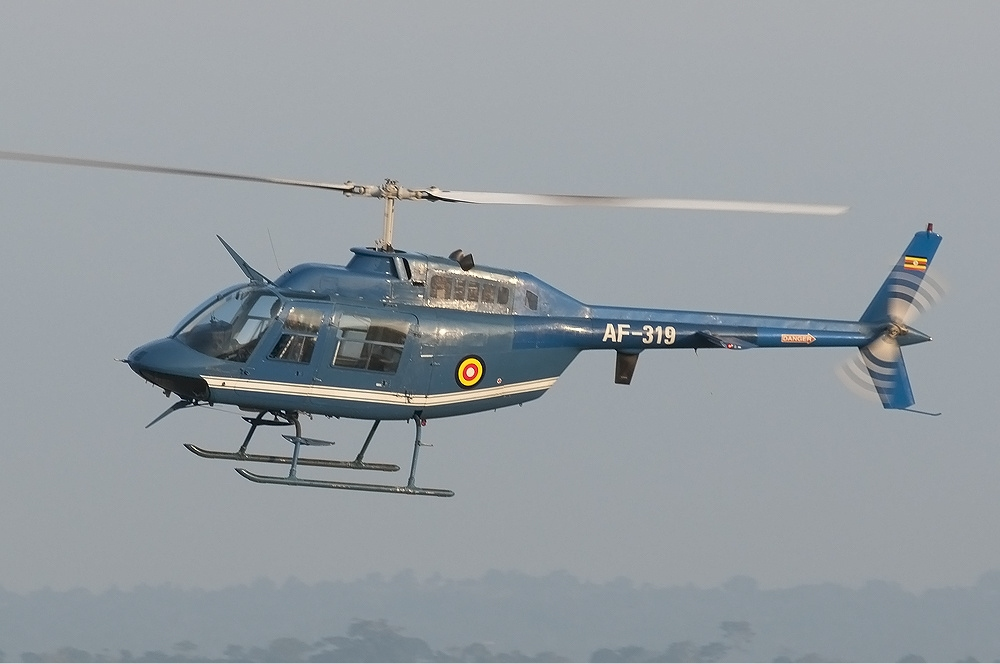
Ugandan Air Force Bell 206

Uganda

- Ugandan Air Force

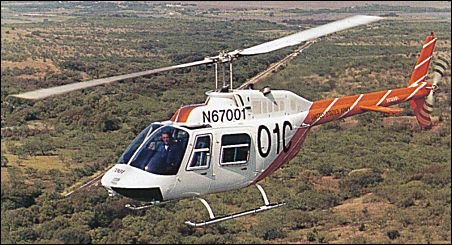
A TH-67A Creek of the US Army

United States

- Chicago Police Department
- San Juan County Sheriff Dept.

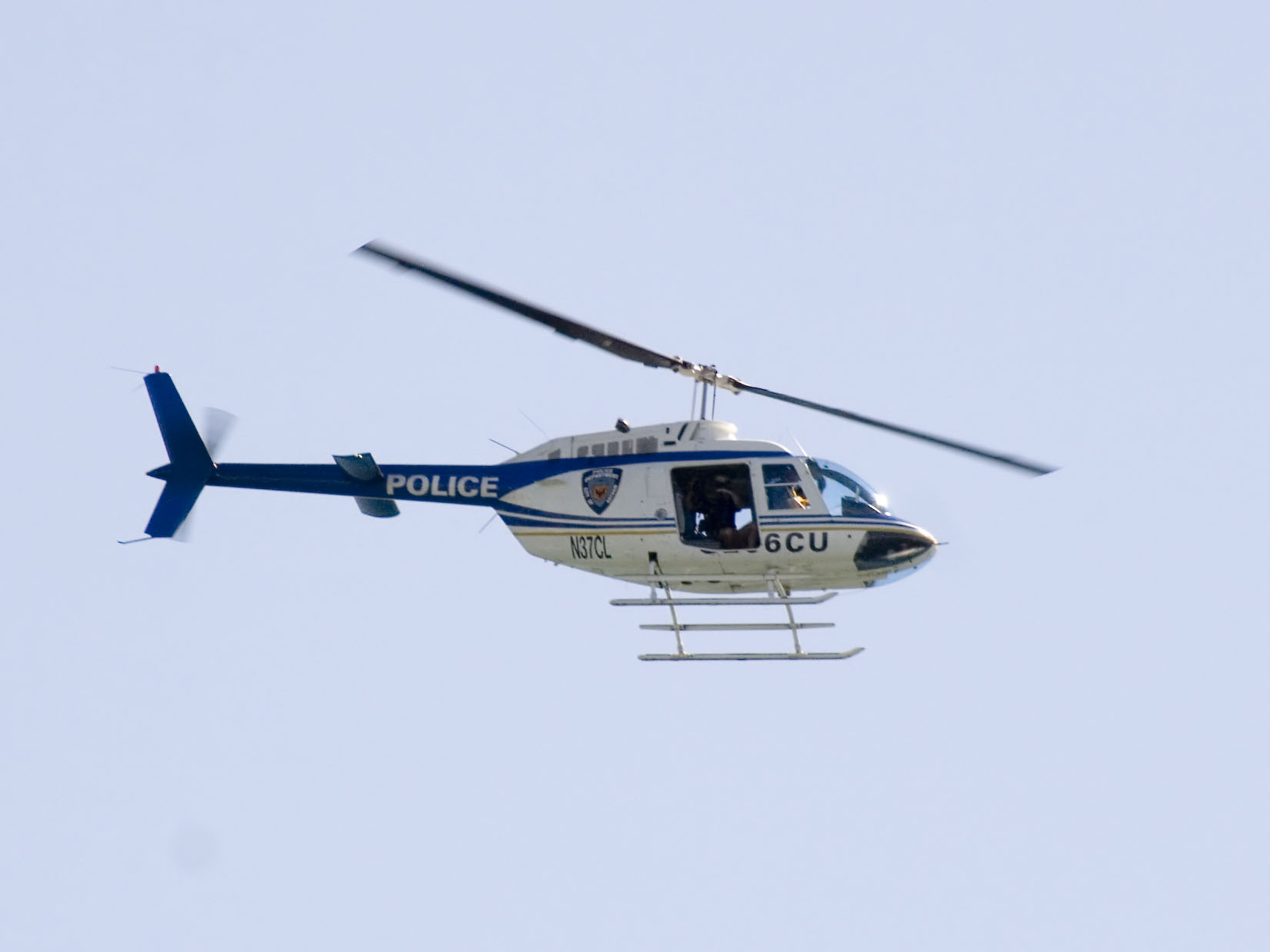
A Chicago Police Department Bell 206

- Los Angeles Police Department
- Memphis Police Department
- Omaha Police Department
- King County Sheriff's Office
- New Jersey State Trooper
- Missouri State Highway Patrol
- United States Army
- United States Navy
- United States Department of the Interior

Venezuela

- Venezuelan Army
- Venezuelan Navy

Yemen

- Yemeni Air Force

=== Former operators ===
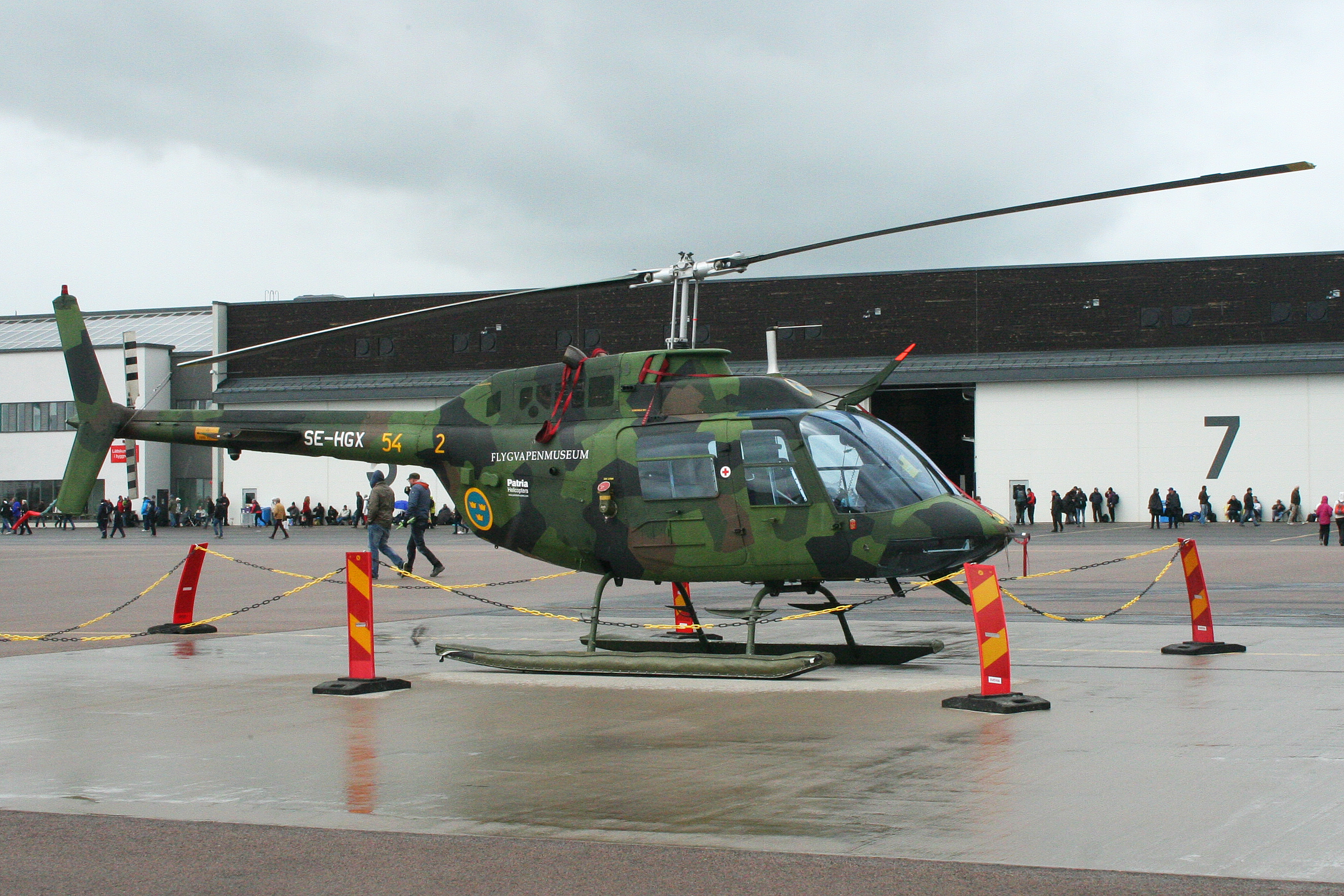
Swedish Navy Bell 206B in camouflage

Australia

- Australian Army
- Royal Australian Navy

Austria

- Austrian Air Force

Canada

- Canadian Forces
- Canadian Coast Guard

Chile

- Chilean Army

Ethiopia
Indonesia

- Indonesian Army Aviation Center
- Indonesian National Police – Retired in 2007

Pahlavi Iran

- Imperial Iranian Army
- Imperial Iranian Gendarmerie
- Imperial Iranian Navy

Jamaica

- Jamaica Defence Force

Kuwait

- Kuwait Air Force

North Macedonia

- North Macedonia Air Brigade

Malta

- Armed Forces of Malta

Serbia

- Serbian Police

Sweden

- Swedish Army
- Swedish Navy
- Swedish Police

Zambia

- Zambian Air Force

== Notable accidents and incidents ==
On August 1, 1977, famous U-2 spy plane pilot Francis Gary Powers was piloting a helicopter for KNBC Channel 4 over West Los Angeles, California, when the aircraft crashed, killing him and cameraman George Spears. They were video recording bush fires in Santa Barbara County in the station's helicopter and were leaving the area.

On August 27, 1990, musician Stevie Ray Vaughan, pilot Jeff Brown, and three members of Eric Clapton's crew, Bobby Brooks, Nigel Browne, and Colin Smythe, were killed in a Bell 206B crash.

On October 25, 1991, a Bell 206 carrying rock music concert promoter Bill Graham, his girlfriend Melissa Gold, and pilot Steve Kahn crashed into a transmission tower west of Vallejo, California, killing everyone on board. The cause of the accident was determined to be the pilot's intentional flight into known adverse weather conditions.

On January 12, 1994, an Agusta-Bell 206A-1 crashed while attempting to land at the helipad of the Central Command headquarters in Neve Yaakov, Israel, killing all four occupants on board, including IDF Major General Nehemiah Tamari.

On March 9, 2009, Bangladesh Army aviation unit Bell 206L flown by pilot Lt Col MD Shahidul Islam and co-pilot Major Saif crashed at Rouha in Kalihati sub-district. The helicopter was carrying General Officer Commanding of 55th Infantry Division and Jessore Area Commander Maj Gen Rafiqul Islam. Maj Gen Islam and pilot Lt Col Islam died in the crash while co-pilot Major Saif sustained serious injuries.

On August 15, 2010, a Bell 206B of the Missouri State Highway Patrol crashed after it ran out of fuel, killing pilot Sergeant Joseph George Schuengel.

On August 20, 2014, Guatemala's Chief of the General Staff of the Armed Forces Rudy Ortiz was killed when his Bell 206 crashed.

On February 11, 2019, Brazilian journalist Ricardo Boechat and the pilot were killed when Bell 206B, PT-HPG, crashed into a truck while attempting an emergency landing on a highway.

On April 10, 2025, a sightseeing Bell 206 LongRanger IV (L-4) crashed into the Hudson River off Newport, Jersey City, killing all six occupants. Witnesses described the helicopter as coming apart in mid-air, with the rotor still spinning, detached from the body. There was criticism that, while vehicles used as licensed taxis must be replaced after five to eight years, there are no such rules for helicopters that may be 30 or 40 years old; the 2025 crash was of a 21-year-old aircraft. There were recommendations that all New York helicopter use should be restricted to services that needed them—police, military, government, news—rather than tourism.

On June 14, 2026, a Eurocopter AS350 Écureuil collided with a Bell 206B Jetranger III over in Recreio dos Bandeirantes, Rio De Janeiro. Among the victims were American singer-songwriter Oliver Tree, Argentine YouTuber Gaspi, Argentine director and screenwriter Lucas A. Vignale, Brazilian music producer Lucas Frota, and pilot Alexandre Souza.

On August 17, 2026, a privately chartered Bell 206 crashed and caught fire in the Tholos area of Sifnos, Greece, shortly before landing at the island's helipad, killing British newlyweds Alexander Cromie and Marie Ebert, who were on their honeymoon, and Greek pilot Giorgos Raikos. Greece's Civil Aviation Authority said a preliminary assessment indicated a possible malfunction of the tail rotor, and called on operators of Bell 206 helicopters to inspect the tail rotor and tail rotor drive system before takeoff.

== Specifications (206B Jetranger II) ==
Bell 206A JetRanger 3-view drawing

Data from Jane's All The World's Aircraft, 1976-1977

General characteristics

- Crew: 1
- Capacity: 4 passengers
- Length: 38 ft 9.5 in (11.824 m) including rotors
- Fuselage length: 31 ft 2 in (9.50 m)
- Height: 9 ft 6.5 in (2.908 m)
- Interior dimensions: 7 ft 2 in (2.18 m) length, by 4 ft 2 in (1.27 m) width, by 4 ft 3 in (1.30 m) height, plus 16 ft^{3} (453 L) baggage compartment
- Empty weight: 1,455 lb (660 kg)
- Max takeoff weight: 3,200 lb (1,451 kg)
- Powerplant: 1 × Allison 250-C20 turboshaft engine, 400 hp (298 kW)
- Main rotor diameter: 33 ft 4 in (10.16 m)
- Main rotor area: 873 sq ft (81.1 m^{2})
- Blade section: – NACA 0012 mod (11.3%)

Performance

- Maximum speed: 122 kn (140 mph, 226 km/h) at MTOW (sea level)
- Maximum speed at 5,000 ft: 116 kn (133 mph; 215 km/h) at MTOW
- Cruise speed: 120 kn (140 mph, 220 km/h) at MTOW, 5,000 feet
- Range: 337 nmi (388 mi, 624 km) at MTOW, 5,000 feet, cruise speed, no reserves
- Service ceiling: 20,000 ft (6,100 m) at MTOW
- Rate of climb: 1,350 ft/min (6.9 m/s)
- Disk loading: 4 lb/sq ft (20 kg/m^{2})
- Power/mass: 0.09 hp/lb (0.15 kW/kg)

== See also ==
Related development

- Bell 505 Jet Ranger X
- Bell 407
- Bell OH-58 Kiowa
- HESA Shahed 278
- HESA Shahed 285

Aircraft of comparable role, configuration, and era

- Eurocopter AS350 Écureuil
- Eurocopter EC120 Colibri
- Eurocopter EC130
- Hiller FH1100
- MD Helicopters MD 500
- PZL SW-4 Puszczyk
- Robinson R66

Related lists

- List of military aircraft of the United States
- List of most-produced rotorcraft

== Bibliography ==
- Elliot, Bryn (March–April 1997). "Bears in the Air: The US Air Police Perspective". Air Enthusiast. No. 68. pp. 46–51. ISSN 0143-5450.
- Elliott, Bryn (May–June 1999). "On the Beat: The First 60 Years of Britain's Air Police, Part Two". Air Enthusiast (81): 64–69. ISSN 0143-5450.
- Hoyle, Craig (December 10–16, 2013). "World Air Forces Directory". Flight International. 184 (5419): 24–51. ISSN 0015-3710.
- Hoyle, Craig (December 9–15, 2014). "World Air Forces Directory". Flight International. 186 (5468): 24–55. ISSN 0015-3710.
- Hoyle, Craig (November 13, 2025). "2026 World Air Forces directory". Flight International.
- Lambert, Mark, ed. (1991). Jane's All The World's Aircraft 1991–92. Coulsdon, UK: Jane's Defence Data. ISBN 0-7106-0965-5.
- Pelletier, A. J. (1992). Bell Aircraft since 1935. Annapolis, Maryland, US: Naval Institute Press. ISBN 1-55750-056-8.
