= Bell YOH-4 =

Light helicopter

YHO-4 / YOH-4
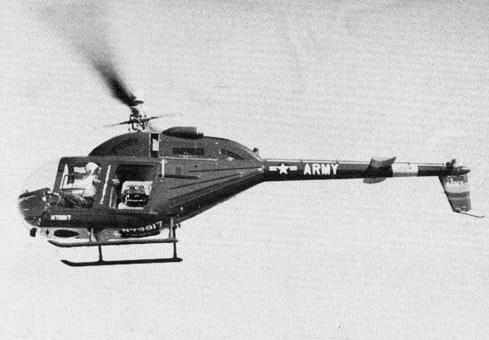
- YOH-4A LOH in flight

General information
- Type: Observation/scout helicopter
- National origin: United States
- Manufacturer: Bell Helicopter
- Primary user: United States Army
- Number built: 5

History
- First flight: 8 December 1962
- Developed into: Bell 206 JetRanger

The Bell YOH-4 (originally YHO-4) is a single-engine, single-rotor light helicopter, developed for the United States Army's Light Observation Helicopter program. While the YOH-4A was unsuccessful in the original LOH competition, Bell redesigned it as the sleek Bell 206A JetRanger for the commercial market, and enjoyed instant and lasting success. In 1967, the Army reopened the LOH competition, and the 206A-based OH-58 Kiowa was selected.

== Development ==
On 14 October 1960, the United States Navy solicited responses from 25 aircraft manufacturers to a request for proposals (RFP) on behalf of the Army for the Light Observation Helicopter (LOH). Bell entered the competition along with 12 other manufacturers, including Hiller Aircraft and Hughes Tool Co., Aircraft Division. In January 1961, Bell submitted Design 250 (D-250), which would eventually be designated as the YHO-4. On 19 May 1961, Bell and Hiller were announced as winners of the design competition. (Note: The Navy, which was assisting the Army in the selection phase, recommended the Hiller Model 1100, while the Army team preferred the Bell D-250, and then the 1100. The Selection Board accepted both aircraft for an evaluation test. Afterwards, the acting Army Chief of Staff directed the Selection Board to include the Hughes 369 in the fly-off competition.)

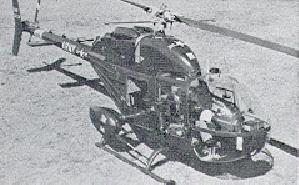
YOH-4A LOH

Bell produced five prototypes of the D-250, as Model 206, in 1962, the first prototype making its maiden flight on 8 December 1962. That same year, all aircraft began to be designated according to the new Joint Services designation system, so the prototype aircraft were redesignated YOH-4A. The YOH-4A also became known as the Ugly Duckling in comparison to the other contending aircraft. Following a flyoff of the Bell, Hughes and Fairchild-Hiller prototypes, the Hughes OH-6 was selected in May 1965.

After the failed military contract bid, Bell attempted to market the Model 206, but it did not fare well commercially. Bell's market research showed that customers found the body design mostly unpalatable. Bell would eventually redesign the body of the airframe to a more sleek and aesthetic design and reintroduced it as the Bell 206A JetRanger.

== Variants ==
YHO-4
Bell 206 powered by a 250shp T63-A-5 for Army evaluation, five built later redesignated YOH-4A
YOH-4A
YHO-4s redesignated.

== Operators ==
United States

- United States Army

== Surviving aircraft ==
The remaining OH-4A 62-4202 is in storage at the United States Army Aviation Museum, Fort Novosel, Alabama.

== Specifications (OH-4A) ==
Data from U.S. Army Aircraft Since 1947

General characteristics

- Crew: 1 pilot
- Capacity: up to 3 passengers or 2 stretchers
- Length: 38 ft 8 in (11.79 m)
- Height: 8 ft 10 in (2.69 m)
- Empty weight: 1,536 lb (697 kg)
- Max takeoff weight: 2,537 lb (1,151 kg)
- Powerplant: 1 × Allison T63-A-5 turboshaft engine, 250 shp (190 kW)
- Main rotor diameter: 33 ft 3 in (10.13 m)
- Main rotor area: 842.3 sq ft (78.25 m^{2})
- Blade section: - NACA 0012 mod (11.3%)

Performance

- Maximum speed: 117 kn (135 mph, 217 km/h)
- Cruise speed: 96 kn (110 mph, 178 km/h)
- Range: 246 nmi (283 mi, 456 km)
- Service ceiling: 20,000 ft (6,100 m)

== See also ==
- U.S. Helicopter Armament Subsystems

Related development

- Bell 206
- Bell OH-58 Kiowa

Aircraft of comparable role, configuration, and era

- Fairchild Hiller YOH-5
- Hughes OH-6 Cayuse

Related lists

- List of active United States military aircraft
