= Fairchild Hiller FH-1100 =

American light helicopter

FH-1100
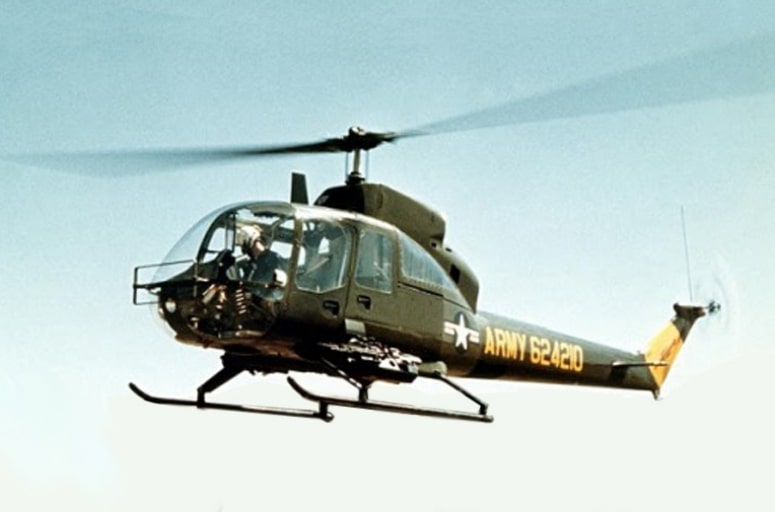
- U.S. Army YOH-5A flight in 1963

General information
- Type: Helicopter
- Manufacturer: Fairchild Hiller
- Status: Currently in use
- Primary users: Okanagan Helicopters Royal Thai Police
- Number built: 253

History
- Manufactured: 1966-1973
- Introduction date: 1966
- First flight: 21 January 1963

The Fairchild Hiller FH-1100 is a single-engine turbine, single two-bladed rotor, light helicopter that was designed and produced by the American aircraft manufacturer Fairchild Hiller in the 1960s.

Originally designated as the Model 1100, it was produced as the company's design submission for the United States Army's Light Observation Helicopter (LOH) program. It was one of the three winning designs in May 1961, after which the military designation Hiller YOH-5 was assigned; the prototype performed its maiden flight on 21 January 1963. However, following extensive evaluations of the type, the Model 1100 did not receive a production contract after Hiller was underbid by the rival Hughes Tool Co. Aircraft Division's OH-6 Cayuse in 1965.

Shortly following the purchase of Hiller Aircraft by Fairchild Engine and Airplane Corporation during 1964, the company decided to focus its efforts on the Model 1100, which was marketed as the FH-1100, towards other opportunities, both on the civilian market and with international military air services. Quantity production of the FH-1100 came to an end in 1973; support for existing operators was maintained. Manufacturing was briefly restarted during the 1980s, but did not achieve large numbers. The type certificate is presently held by the FH1100 Manufacturing Corporation of Century, Florida.

== Development ==
=== Background ===
During the 1940s and 1950s, the American company Hiller Aircraft had established itself as an early participant in the design and production of helicopters, producing the Hiller Model 360 for various customers. In 1960, Hiller merged with the Electra Corporation and made considerable investments into their production range, developing an improved Model 360 and seeking out other business opportunities for rotorcraft. Simultaneously, in October 1960, the United States Army issued a request for proposals (RFP) for the Light Observation Helicopter (LOH) program. Months later, Hiller, along with 12 other manufacturers, including Bell Helicopter (Bell) and Hughes Tool Co. Aircraft Division (Hughes), decided to respond and formally entered the competition.

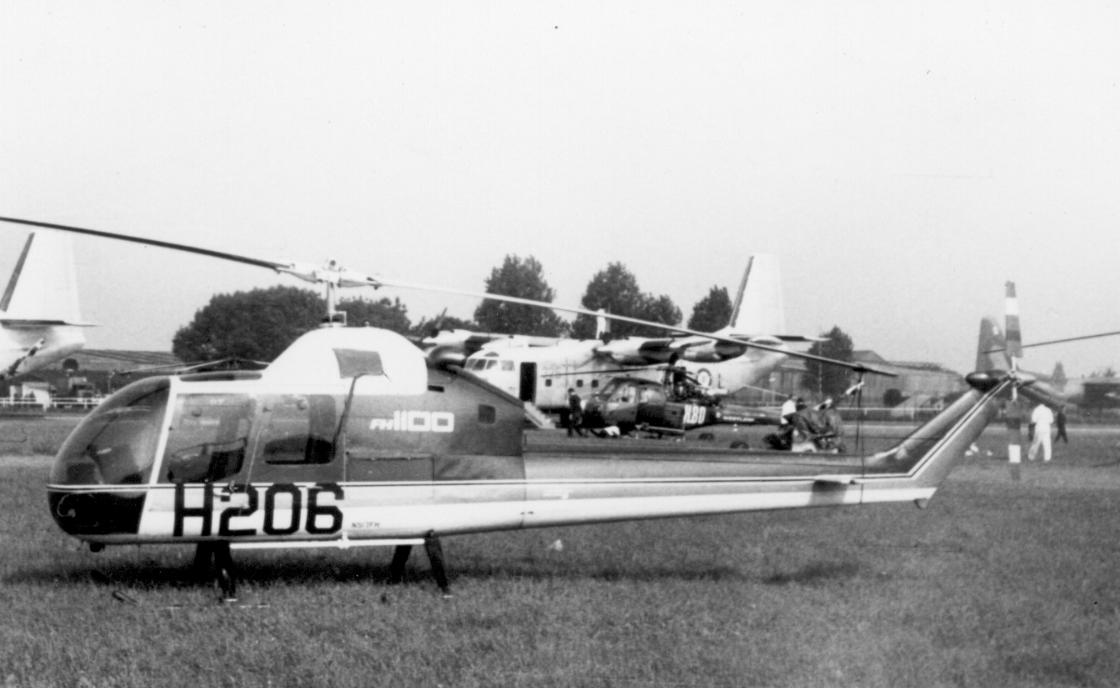
An FH-1100 on display at the Paris Air Show 1967

Hiller's submission was internally designated as the Model 1100. All of the submissions were evaluated by a United States Navy team, which recommended the Model 1100 and led to it being selected as one of three winners of the design competition by the Army in May 1961. Accordingly, the Army officially designated the Model 1100 as the Hiller YHO-5; in 1962, the designation was changed to YOH-5A. During November 1961, detailed design work on the YOH-5 commenced.

On 21 January 1963, the prototype YOH-5 conducted its maiden flight. Hiller produced a total of five aircraft that were delivered to the U.S. Army, which put them through a Test and Evaluation exercise at Fort Rucker, Alabama, in 1963. The performance of the three company's designs were competitively evaluated against one another as well as the specification requirements, leading to the rival Bell YOH-4 being eliminated from the program while Hiller and Hughes competed in a program cost analysis phase to receive a production contract. In 1965, it was determined that Hughes had underbid Hiller's submission and that the Army had selected Hughes' YOH-6 instead. Despite Hiller filing a formal protest, their submission was formally eliminated and Hughes was awarded a production contract for the OH-6 Cayuse.

=== Pursuing other opportunities ===
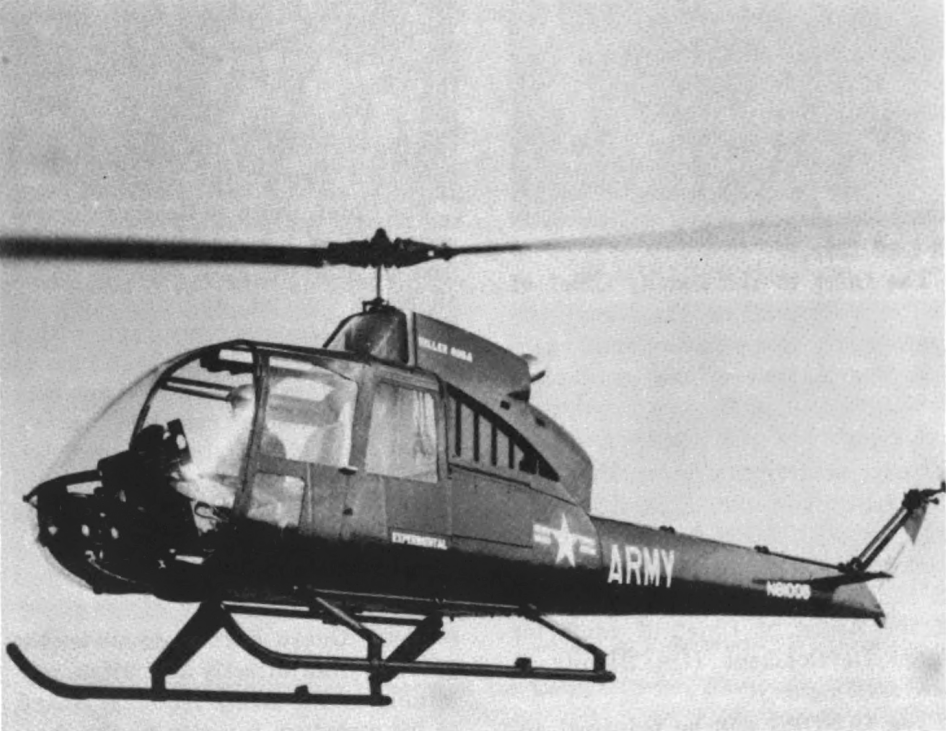
YOH-5A on flight tests, 1963

During 1967, as a result of price escalations for both the OH-6 and associated components, the U.S. Army decided Hughes that could not fulfil the contractual production demands and opted to reopen bids for the LOH program. Despite this apparent reversal of fortunes, Fairchild-Hiller decided that it would not resubmit the YOH-5A to the competition, or make any submission; instead, the company would focus its efforts upon on the commercial sector, to which it was already marketing a civil model of the Model 1100. Even prior to the LOH program being reopened to bids, Hiller had decided to continue development of the Model 1100, which it marketed as the FH-1100.

In 1964, Hiller had been acquired by the Fairchild Engine and Airplane Corporation to become Fairchild-Hiller; shortly thereafter, the new company decided to discontinue its activity on older rotorcraft in order to focus its resources on the FH-1100, which it would market primarily towards civilian customers, as well as to various international military air services. While early operators of the FH-1100 were impacted by a serious issue with the Allison Model 250-C18 turboshaft powerplant it used, the exhibited failure rate was less than that of the competing Bell 206A JetRanger.

During 1973, due to a lack of orders, production of the FH-1100 was terminated; however, support for those rotorcraft that had already been produced was maintained. The rights to the rotorcraft were obtained by Hiller Aviation; while preparations were made to resume quantity production, but wider corporate matters proved disruptive to this ambition. In April 1984, the Rogerson Aircraft Corporation acquired Hiller and, under the name Rogerson Hiller Helicopters, produced five FH-1100s over a four-year period up to 1987. The company also had plans to develop an enlarged derivative. In 2000, the Type Certificate was purchased by FH1100 Manufacturing Corporation. In the following years, FH1100 Manufacturing has announced its intention to resume manufacturing of the type, which will reportedly include the updating and redesign of various components such as the rotor blades, nose, and cockpit. In addition, the company provides support and training services to operators of existing FH-1100s.

== Design ==
The Fairchild Hiller FH-1100 is a single-engine, single two-bladed rotor, light helicopter. It is a relatively conventional rotorcraft, featuring an extensive cockpit glazing that provides favourable external visibility and provides seating for four passengers in addition to the pilot. The interior is designed to suit various purposes, from a four-seat configuration intended for executive travel to a more compact five-seat arrangement; provisions for its use as both a military and utility helicopter were made from the onset. The FH-1100 is equipped with skid landing gear that is suitable for austere or rough field operations.

The FH-1100 is powered by a single Allison Model 250-C18 turboshaft engine, capable of generating up to 317 shp (236 kW); it provided a considerable boost in performance over that of piston-powered contemporaries. However, in comparison to the similar-sized Bell 206A JetRanger, the FH-1100 has a lower continuous maximum speed and a reduced load-carrying capacity, despite sharing the same engine. Advantages over the JetRanger included a cheaper purchase cost and the inclusion of a stability augmentation system. The FH-1100 also had a greater hover ceiling than most contemporary helicopters of its size. Various considerations for ease of maintenance were also incorporated into various aspects of the rotorcraft, such as engine access.

== Variants ==
Hiller Model 1100
Four-seat prototype powered by an Allison 250-C10 engine and certified in May 1964.

FH-1100
Civil production five-seat model powered by an Allison 250-C18 engine and certified in November 1966. Later production fitted with an Allison 250-C20B engine. 246-built

RH-1100A Pegasus
Updated civil version, built and marketed by Rogerson Hiller Helicopters.

RH-1100M
Updated military version, built and marketed by Rogerson Hiller Helicopters.

YOH-5A
United States Army designations for five Model 1100 for evaluation powered by a 250shp Allison T-63-A-5 engine.

HU-1
Brazilian Navy designation of the FH-1100.

== Former operators ==
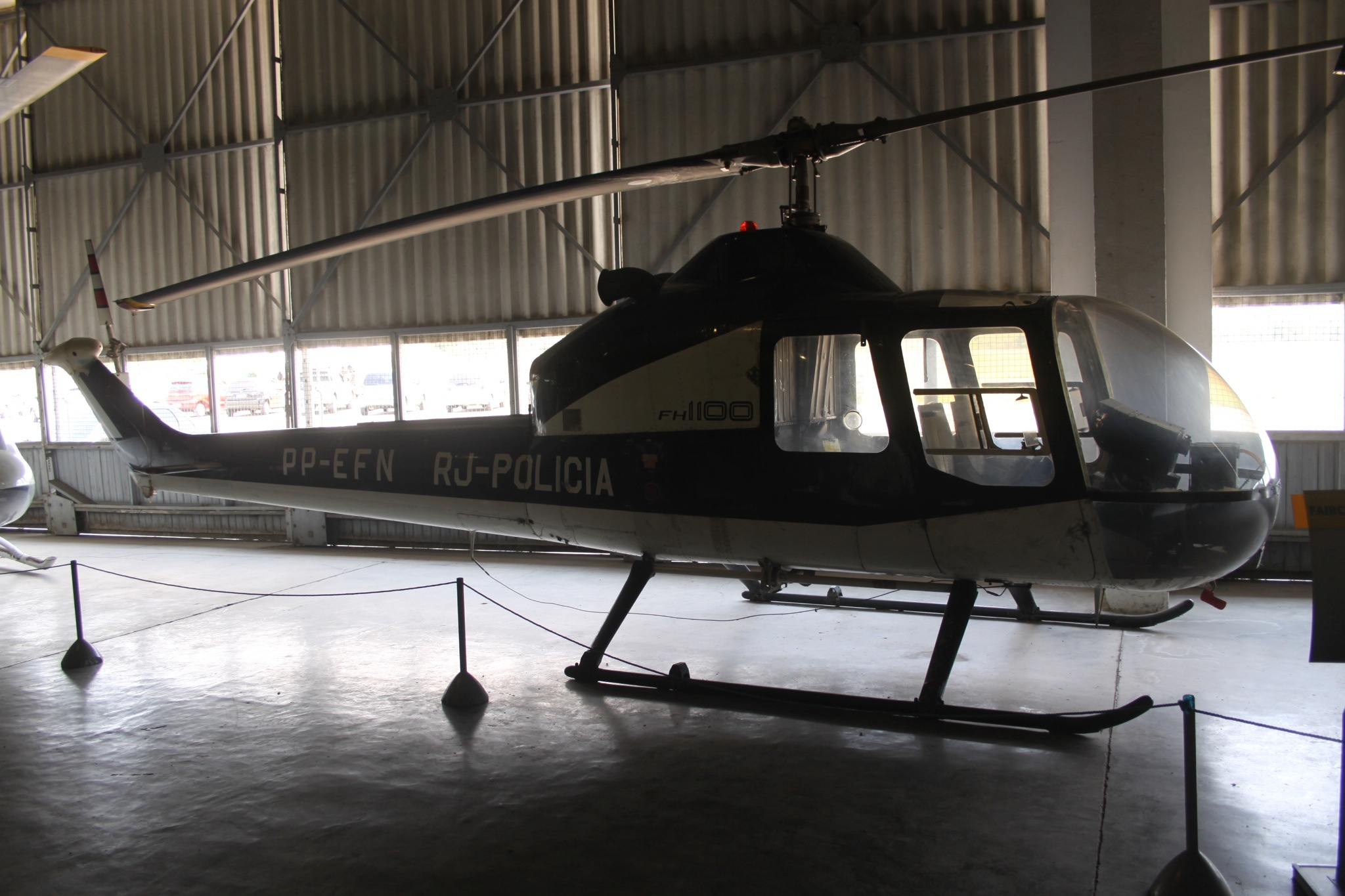
FH-1100 at Campo dos Afonsos, 2012

Argentina

- Argentine Army Aviation - nine received; all survivors were passed to Argentine National Gendarmerie
- Argentine National Gendarmerie

Brazil

- PCERJ
- Brazilian Air Force
- Brazilian Navy - six operated 1968–1977

Canada

- Okanagan Helicopters

Cyprus

- Cyprus Air Command

Ecuador

- Ecuadorian Air Force One delivered 1967

El Salvador

- El Salvador Air Force - Two

Malaysia

- Malaysia Air Charter - Three operated 1964-1977

Panama

- Panamanian Air Force - Three operated

Philippines

- Philippine Air Force - 8 Units.

Thailand

- Royal Thai Border Police - 16 operated.

United States

- Baltimore City Police
- California Highway Patrol
- Nassau County Police Department

== Specifications (FH-1100) ==
Data from Jane's All The World's Aircraft 1966–67, Federal Aviation Administration

General characteristics

- Crew: 1
- Capacity: 4 passengers
- Length: 27 ft 9.5 in (8.471 m) fuselage
- Width: 4 ft 4 in (1.32 m) fuselage
- Height: 9 ft 3.5 in (2.832 m)
- Empty weight: 1,370 lb (621 kg)
- Max takeoff weight: 2,750 lb (1,247 kg)
- Fuel capacity: 69 US gal (57 imp gal; 261 L) internal fuel, with provision for 66 US gal (55 imp gal; 250 L) in two auxiliary tanks on starboard rear fuselage.
- Powerplant: 1 × Allison Model 250-C18 turboshaft engine, 317 shp (236 kW) for take-off
- Main rotor diameter: 35 ft 5 in (10.80 m)
- Main rotor area: 981 sq ft (91.1 m^{2})
- Blade section: - NACA 63-015

Performance

- Cruise speed: 127 mph (204 km/h, 110 kn) maximum at 5,000 ft (1,524 m)

122 mph (106 kn; 196 km/h) economical

- Range: 348 mi (560 km, 302 nmi) max payload, no reserve
- Ferry range: 668 mi (1,075 km, 580 nmi) with ferry tanks, minimum payload no reserve
- Service ceiling: 14,200 ft (4,300 m)
- Hover ceiling IGE: 13,400 ft (4,084 m)
- Hover ceiling OGE: 8,400 ft (2,560 m)
- Rate of climb: 1,600 ft/min (8.1 m/s) maximum
- Vertical rate of climb: 800 ft/min (4.06 m/s)
- Disk loading: 2.8 lb/sq ft (14 kg/m^{2})

== See also ==
Aircraft of comparable role, configuration, and era

- Bell YOH-4
- OH-6 Cayuse
- Bell 206
- MD Helicopters MD 500
