= Light Observation Helicopter =

US Army program

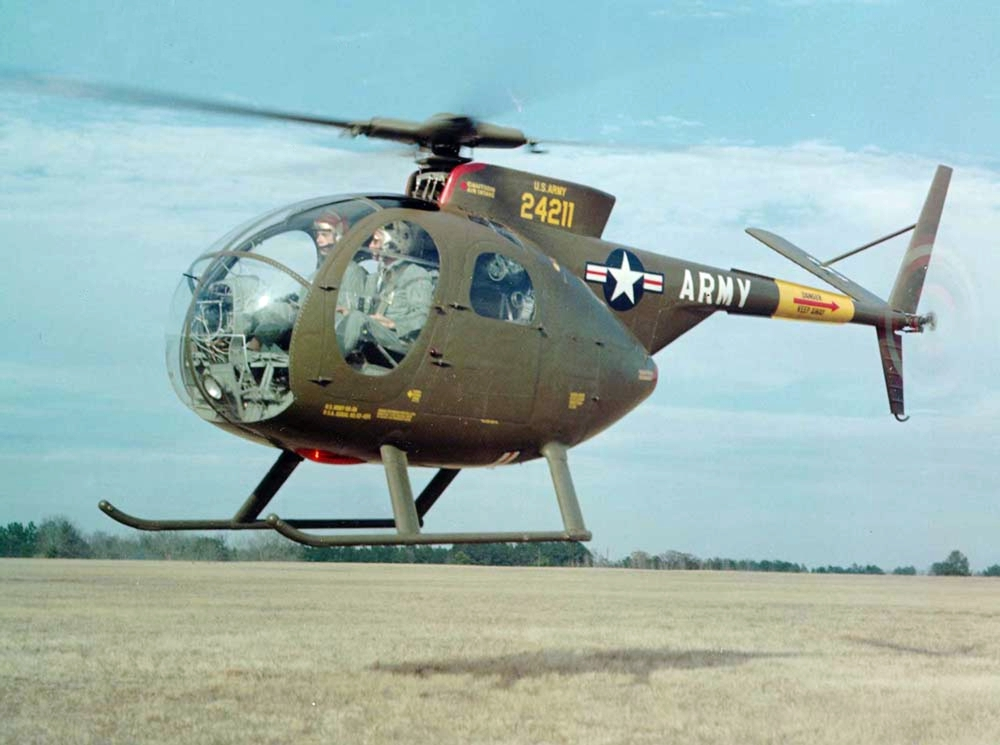
- YOH-6A Cayuse helicopter on liftoff

General information
- Project for: Light Observation Helicopter
- Issued by: United States Navy
- Service: United States Army
- Proposals: Bell YOH-4; Fairchild Hiller YOH-5; Hughes OH-6 Cayuse; Bell OH-58 Kiowa (second round)

History
- Outcome: Hughes OH-6 Cayuse (first round); Bell OH-58 Kiowa (second round)
- Successors: Army Helicopter Improvement Program

The Light Observation Helicopter (LOH) program was a United States Army program to evaluate, develop and field a light scout helicopter to replace the Army's aging Bell OH-13 Sioux. It gained impetus with the advent of the Vietnam War, and was aided by advances in helicopter technology, specifically the development of the turboshaft engine.

== History ==
In July 1953, the Office of Lieutenant General John E. Dahlquist, Chief, Army Field Forces (AFF), forwarded desirable military characteristics for a two-place reconnaissance helicopter to Army Headquarters. Nearly a year later, in May 1954, Dahlquist's office once again emphasized the need for replacement aircraft and recommended procurement of troop test quantities of the YH-32. Preliminary evaluation of the YH-32 design revealed that the aircraft was unsuitable for the mission, and the tests were canceled.

In 1955, the Army Field Forces were transformed into the Continental Army Command (CONARC). Dahlquist, who had been promoted to 4-star General on 18 August 1954, continued in command. On 11 October 1955, CONARC recommended that the Department of the Army initiate a program to develop a replacement observation helicopter for the aging OH-13 Sioux and OH-23 Raven. Army's Chief of Research and Development agreed to include the requirement for a new helicopter in the budget for fiscal year 1957 on 19 March 1956, after CONARC highlighted the continued lack of development for replacement aircraft.

During the course of the next three years, three helicopters would be evaluated as candidates to replace the OH-13 and OH-23; the Sud-Ouest Djinn, the Hughes 269, and the Brantly B-2. The aircraft were designated the YHO-1 DJ, YHO-2 HU, and YHO-3 BR, respectively. By October 1958, service testing of Sud Aviation YHO-1 DJ was completed. The following year saw the completion of the desert and temperate temperature testing of the YHO-2 HU. The YHO-3 BR did not complete user testing after engineering evaluations revealed significant deficiencies. Service testing demonstrated that the YHO-2 had been the most capable, but due to a limited load capability, it was deemed not suitable to replace the OH-13.

=== LOH ===
On 14 October 1960, the United States Navy Bureau of Weapons issued Technical Specification 153, a request for proposals (RFP) for a four-seat, turbine-powered, light observation helicopter capable of fulfilling various roles: personnel transport, escort and attack missions, casualty evacuation and observation. Twenty-five aircraft manufacturers were solicited for the program on behalf of the Army Chief of Transportation. By January 1961, 12 manufacturers, including Cessna, Hughes Tool Co. Aircraft Division, Hiller Aircraft and Bell Helicopters, had responded with 19 designs.

The United States Navy provided technical expertise to assist the Army in evaluating the design proposals. In October 1961, the Army selected three of the designs for a flight evaluation. Bell's D-250 design was recommended by the Army team and designated the YHO-4 (later YOH-4), Hiller's Model 1100 was recommended by the Navy team and became the YHO-5 (later YOH-5), and Hughes' Model 369 was added to the competition and became the YHO-6 (later YOH-6). Each manufacturer submitted 5 test and evaluation prototypes of their designs to the Army for flight test evaluation at Fort Rucker, Alabama.

As a result of the flight evaluation, Hiller's YOH-5 and Hughes' YOH-6 were selected to compete in a program cost analysis bid for the contract. The Hughes bid won the contract, although Hiller protested the contract award, and in 1965, the YOH-6 was redesignated as the OH-6A Cayuse.

=== LOH round 2 ===
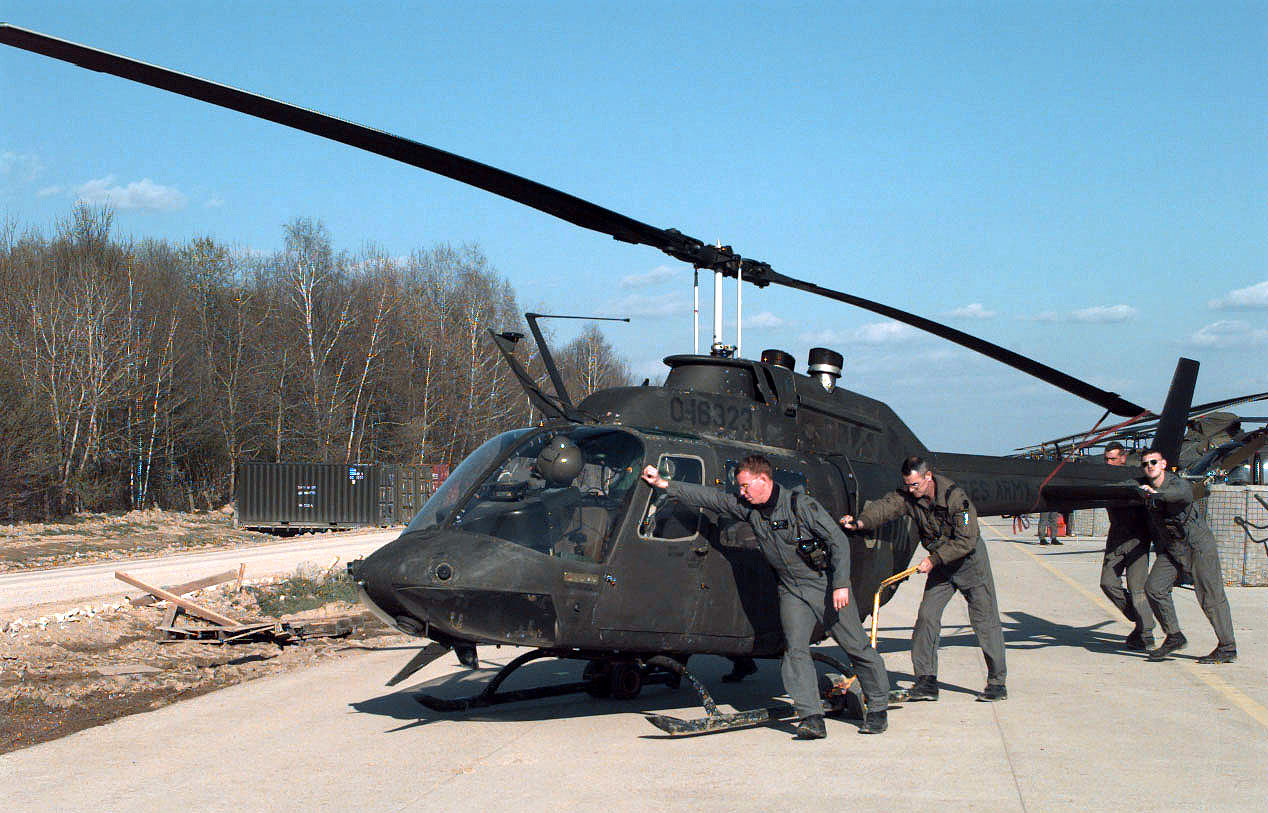
An OH-58 Kiowa, winner of the LOH competition's second round

In 1967, the Army reopened the LOH competition for bids and Bell resubmitted for the program using their model 206A design. Fairchild-Hiller failed to resubmit their bid with the YOH-5A, which they had successfully marketed as the FH-1100. In the end, Bell won the contract and the model 206A was designated as the OH-58A. Following the Army's naming convention for its aircraft, the OH-58A was named Kiowa for the Native American tribe.
