= Wingtip device =

Aircraft component fixed to the end of the wings to improve performance

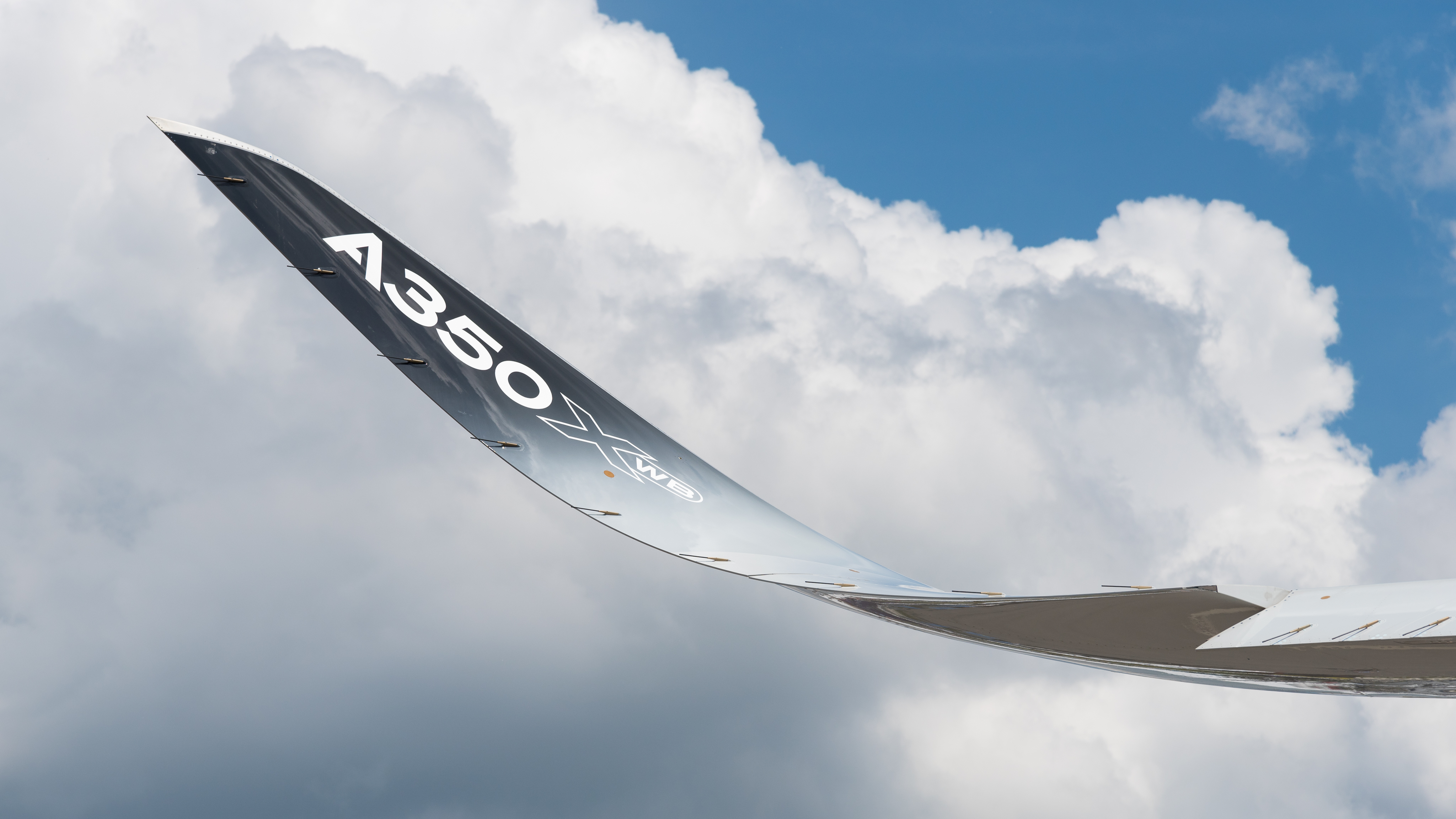
The Airbus A350 wingtip device

Line drawing of wingtip vortices behind a conventional wingtip (on the left) and a blended winglet (on the right)

Wingtip devices are intended to improve the efficiency of fixed-wing aircraft by reducing drag. Although there are several types of wing tip devices which function in different manners, their intended effect is always to reduce an aircraft's drag. Such devices reduce drag by increasing the height of the lifting system, without greatly increasing the wingspan. Extending the span would reduce lift-induced drag, but would increase parasitic drag and would require boosting the strength and weight of the wing. At some point, there is no net benefit from further increased span. There may also be operational considerations that limit the allowable wingspan (e.g., available width at airport gates).

== Physics ==
When a conventional wing generates lift, it also experiences lift-induced drag. Higher pressure air under the wing flows to the lower pressure surface on top at the wingtip, which results in a vortex caused by the forward motion of the aircraft. Trefftz-plane theory shows that increasing the height of the lifting system will decrease induced drag. A vertical fin or winglet will reduce induced drag if it is placed anywhere along the wing off-center of the aircraft, but it is most effective when it is placed at the wingtip.

== Benefits ==
By reducing drag, wingtip devices increase fuel efficiency and aircraft range. Aircraft performance is increased, allowing reduced takeoff field length due to better climb performance, and increased cruise altitude and cruise speed. Takeoff noise is also reduced. In gliders, reduced induced drag results in a higher cross-country speed, again increasing range. Wingtip devices can also enhance safety for following aircraft, by reducing the strength of wingtip vortices.

U.S. Air Force studies indicate that a given improvement in fuel efficiency correlates directly with the causal increase in the aircraft's lift-to-drag ratio.

The average commercial jet sees a 4-6 percent increase in fuel efficiency and as much as a 6% decrease in in-flight noise from the use of winglets. Actual fuel savings and the related carbon output can vary significantly by plane, route and flight conditions.

== Early history ==
=== Wing end-plates ===
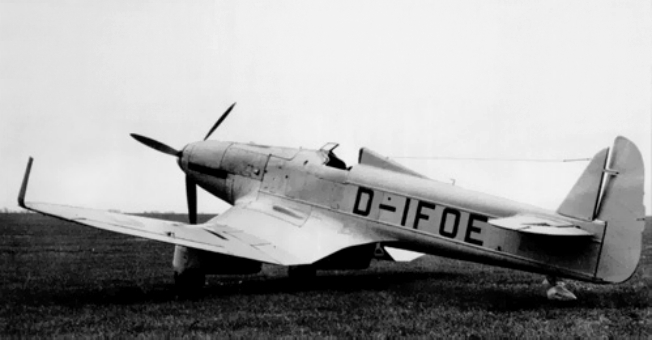
The Ha 137 prototype aircraft, fitted with vertical wing extensions, c.1935–1937

The initial concept dates back to 1897, when English engineer Frederick W. Lanchester patented wing end-plates as a method for controlling wingtip vortices. In the United States, Scottish-born engineer William E. Somerville patented the first functional winglets in 1910. Somerville installed the devices on his early biplane and monoplane designs. Vincent Burnelli received US Patent no: 1,774,474 for his "Airfoil Control Means" on August 26, 1930.

Simple flat end-plates did not cause a reduction in drag, because the increase in profile drag was greater than the decrease in induced drag.

=== Hoerner wing tips ===
Following the end of World War II, Dr. Sighard F. Hoerner was a pioneer researcher in the field, having written a technical paper published in 1952 that called for drooped wingtips whose pointed rear tips focused the resulting wingtip vortex away from the upper wing surface. Drooped wingtips are often called "Hoerner tips" in his honor. Gliders and light aircraft have made use of Hoerner tips for many years.

The earliest-known implementation of a Hoerner-style downward-angled "wingtip device" on a jet aircraft was during World War II. This was the so-called Lippisch-Ohren ("Lippisch ears"), allegedly attributed to the Messerschmitt Me 163's designer Alexander Lippisch, and first added to the M3 and M4 third and fourth prototypes of the Heinkel He 162A Spatz jet light fighter for evaluation. This addition was done in order to counteract the dutch roll characteristic present in the original He 162 design, related to its wings having a marked dihedral angle. This became a standard feature of the approximately 320 completed He 162A jet fighters built, with hundreds more He 162A airframes going unfinished by V-E Day.

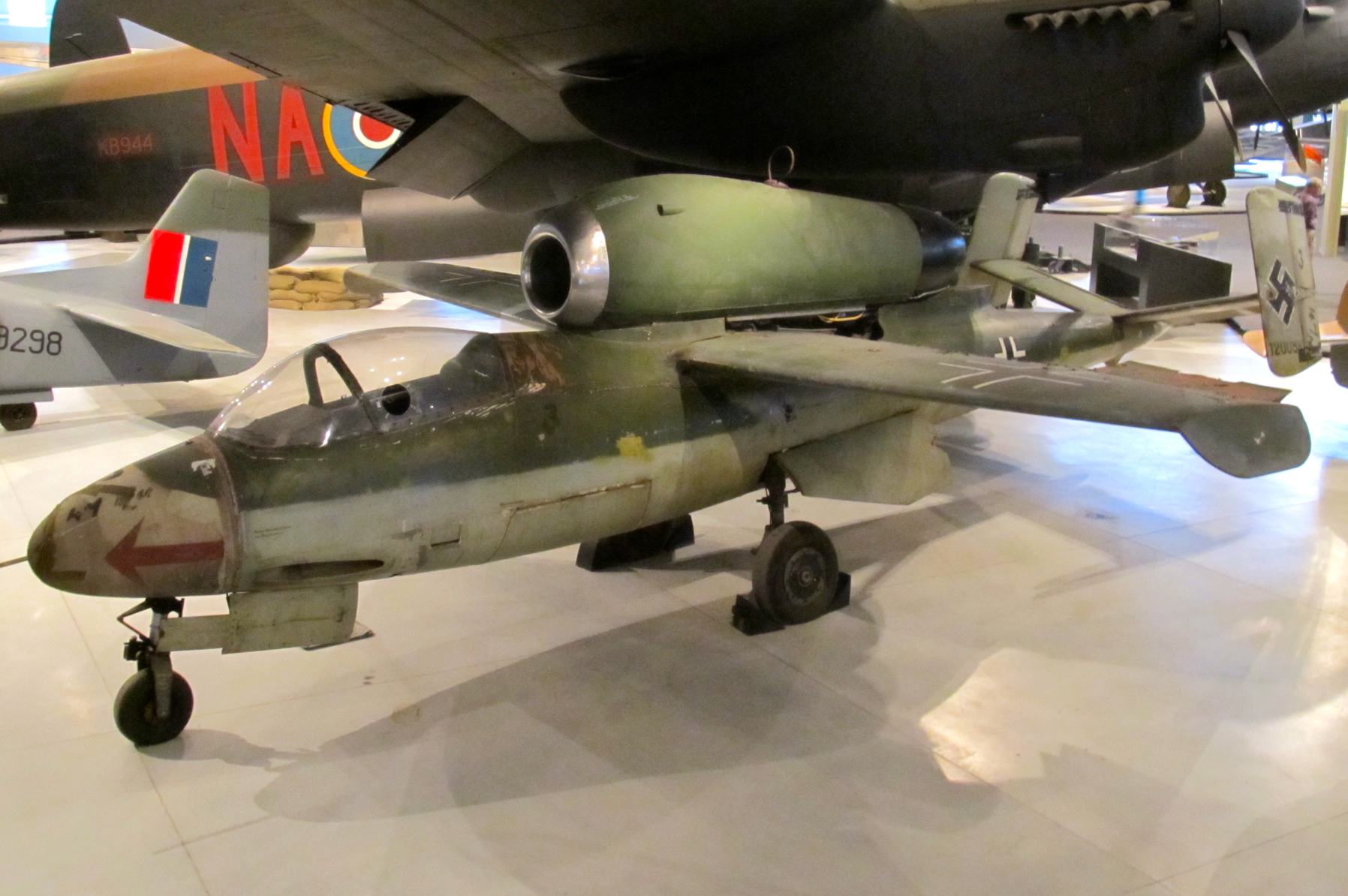
Heinkel He 162A with Lippisch-Ohren wingtip devices

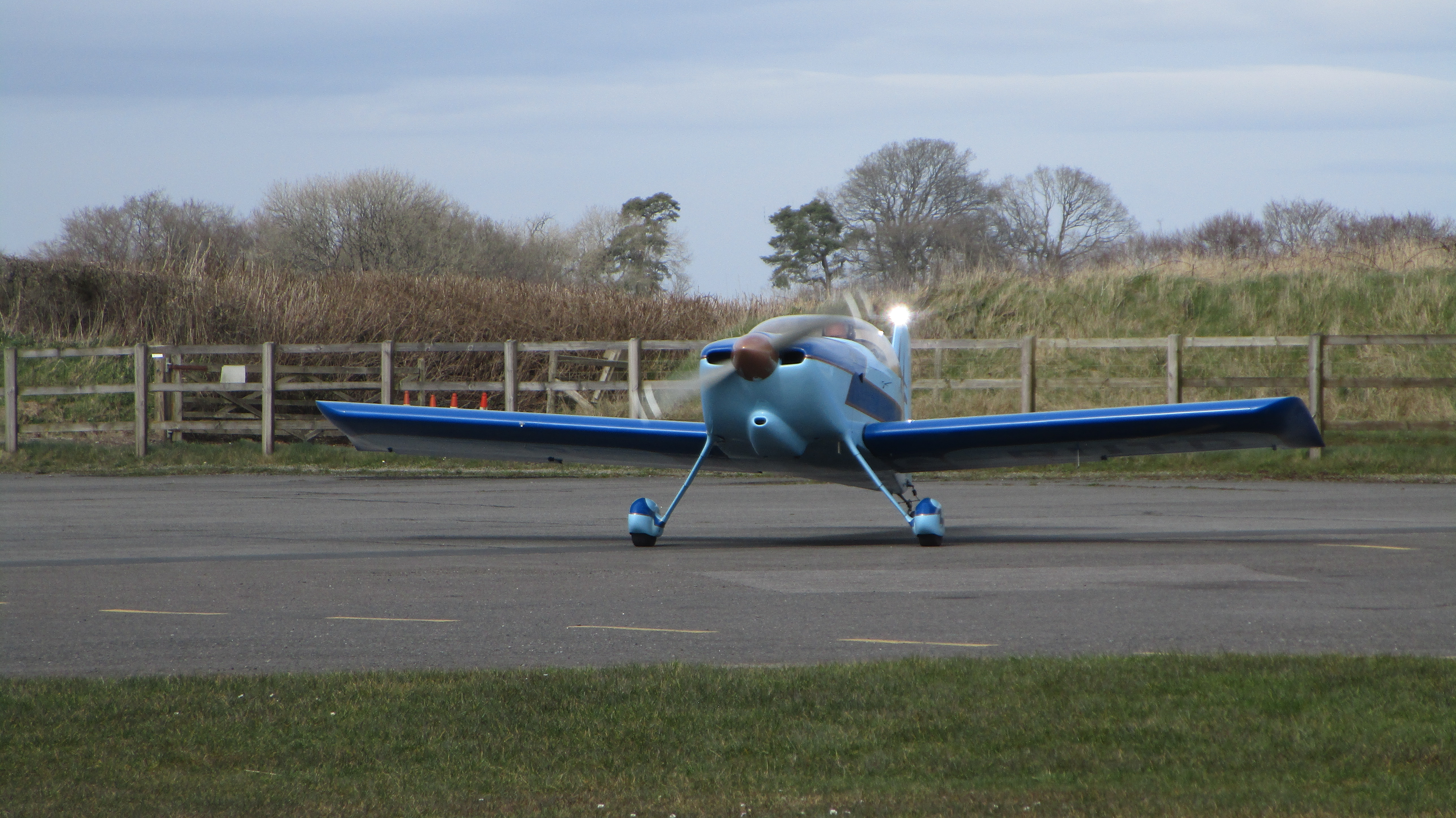
Van's RV-6 showcasing Hoerner-style wingtips

== Winglets ==
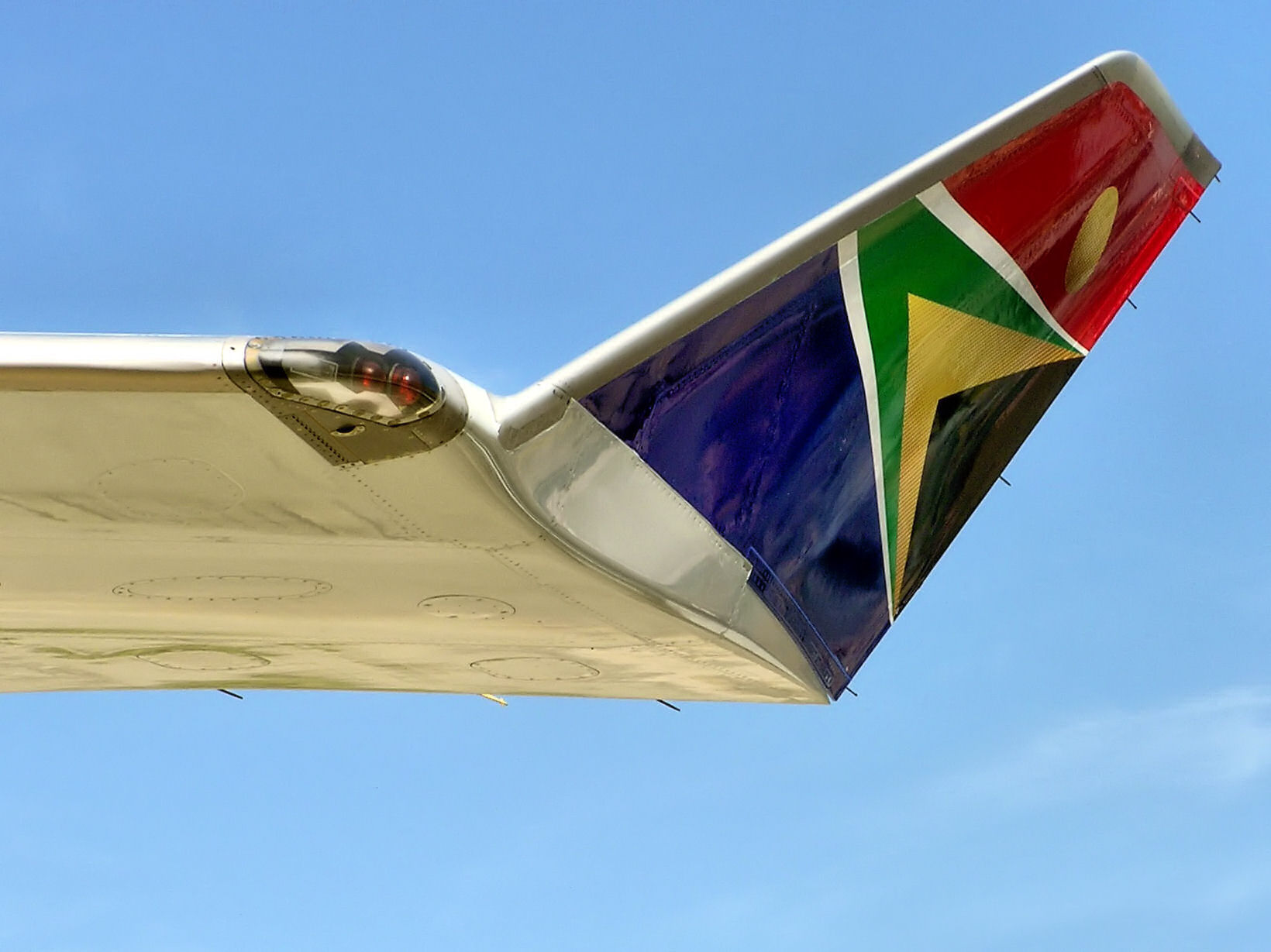
Boeing 747-400 canted winglet

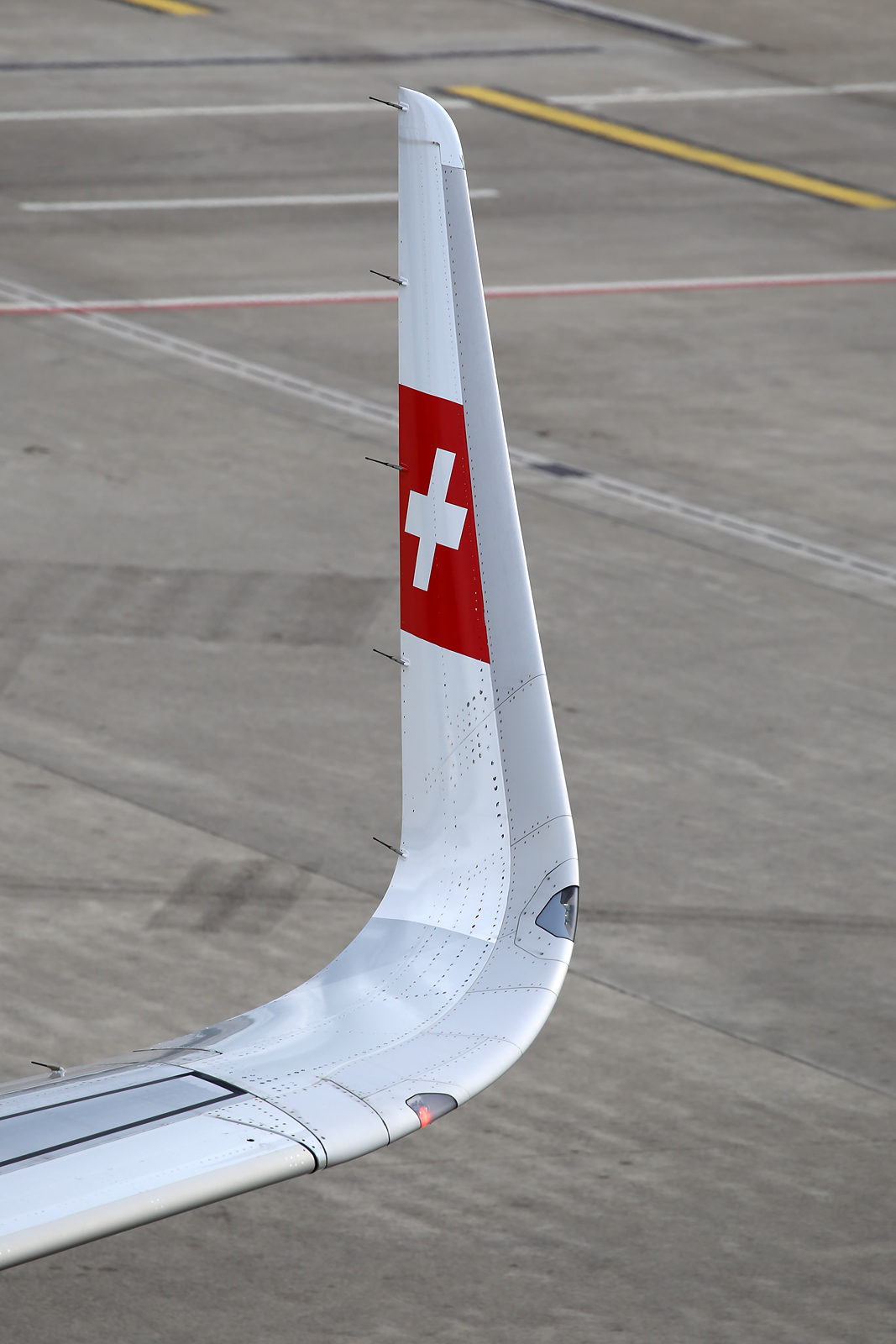
Airbus A320 blended "sharklet"

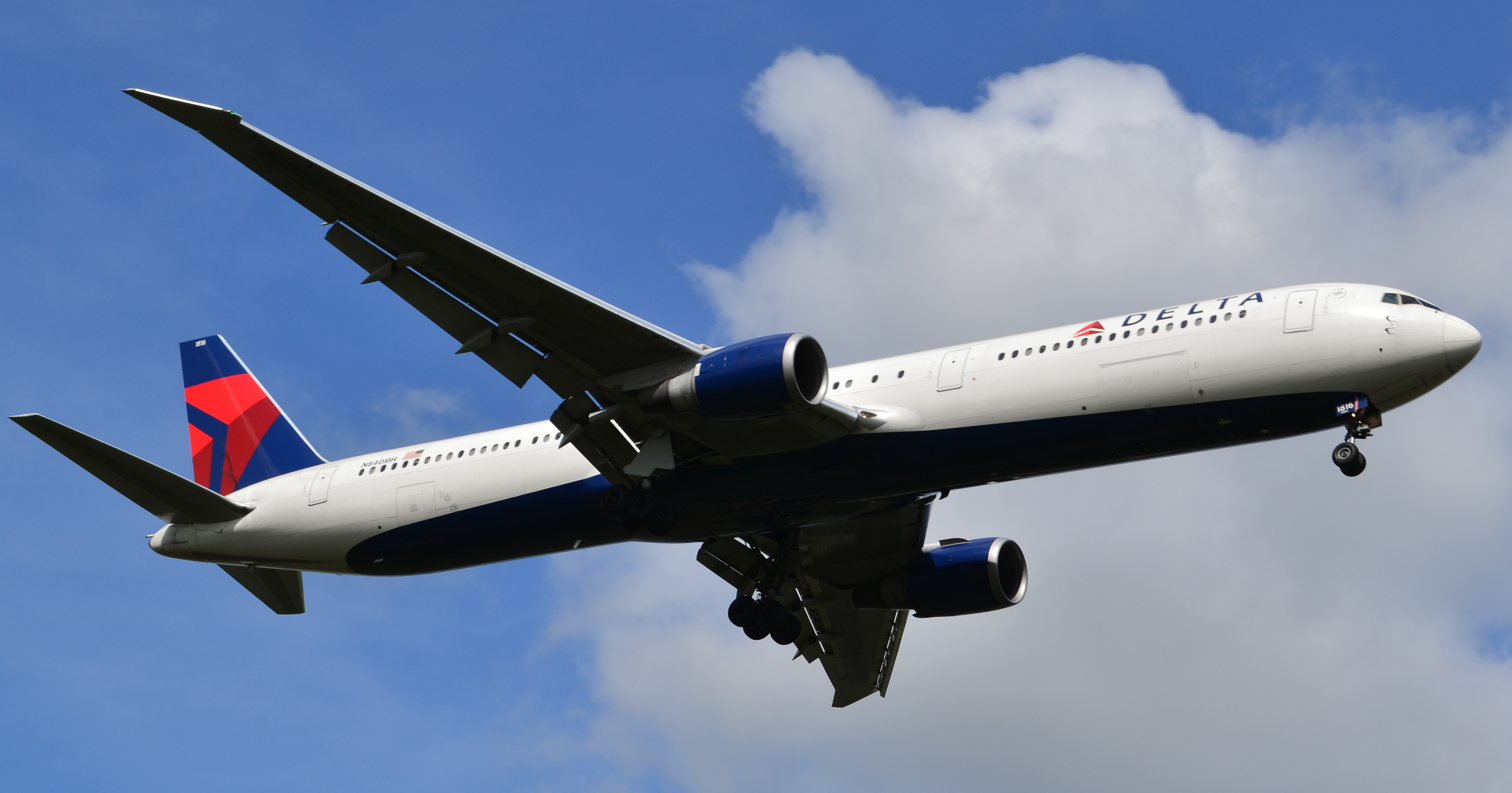
Boeing 767-400ER with raked wingtips

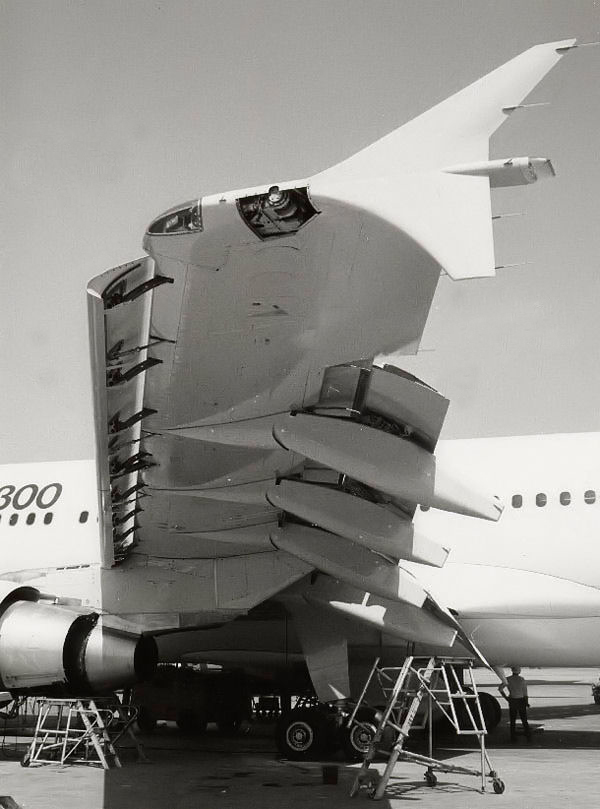
Airbus A310-300 wingtip fence

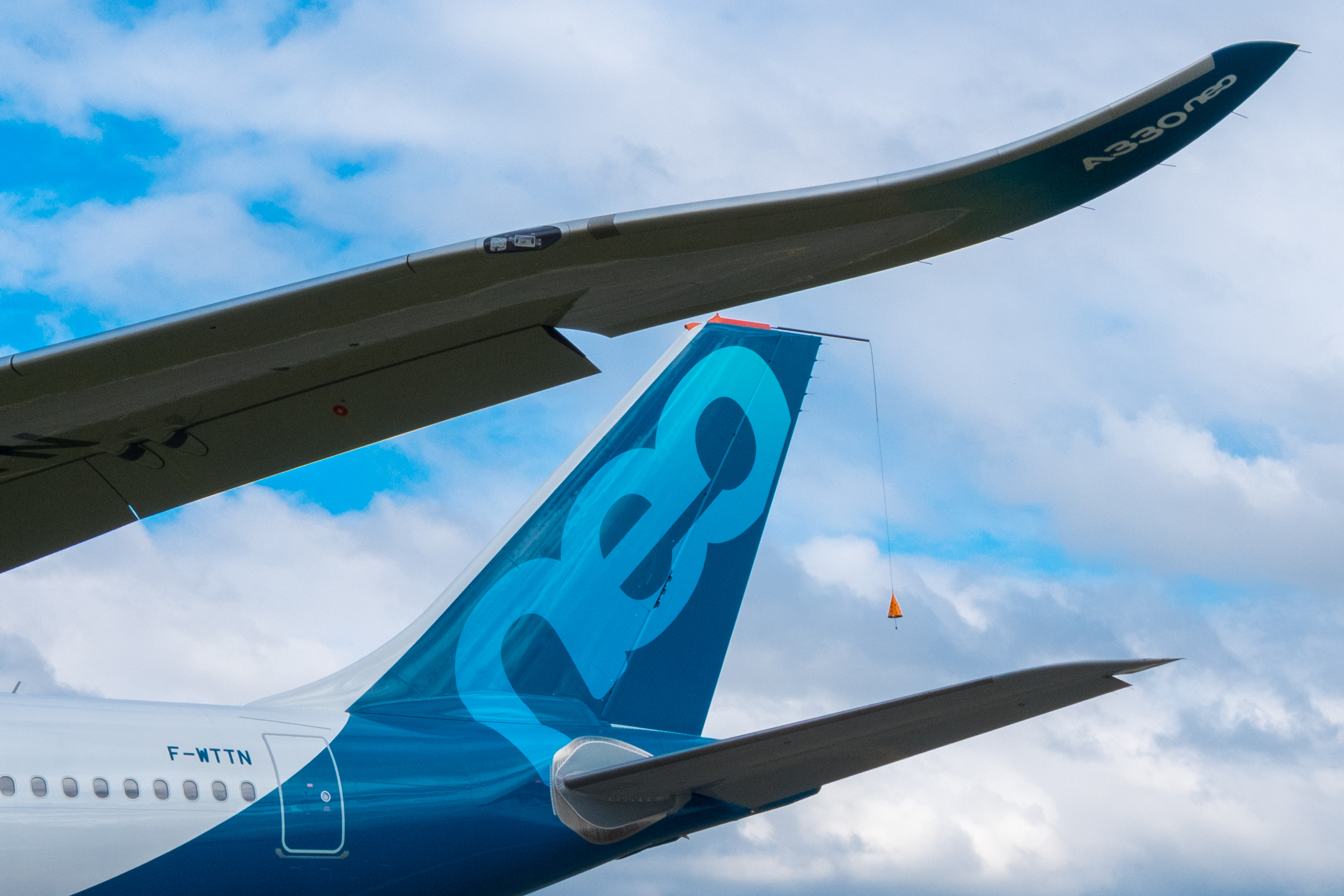
Airbus A330neo blended wingtip

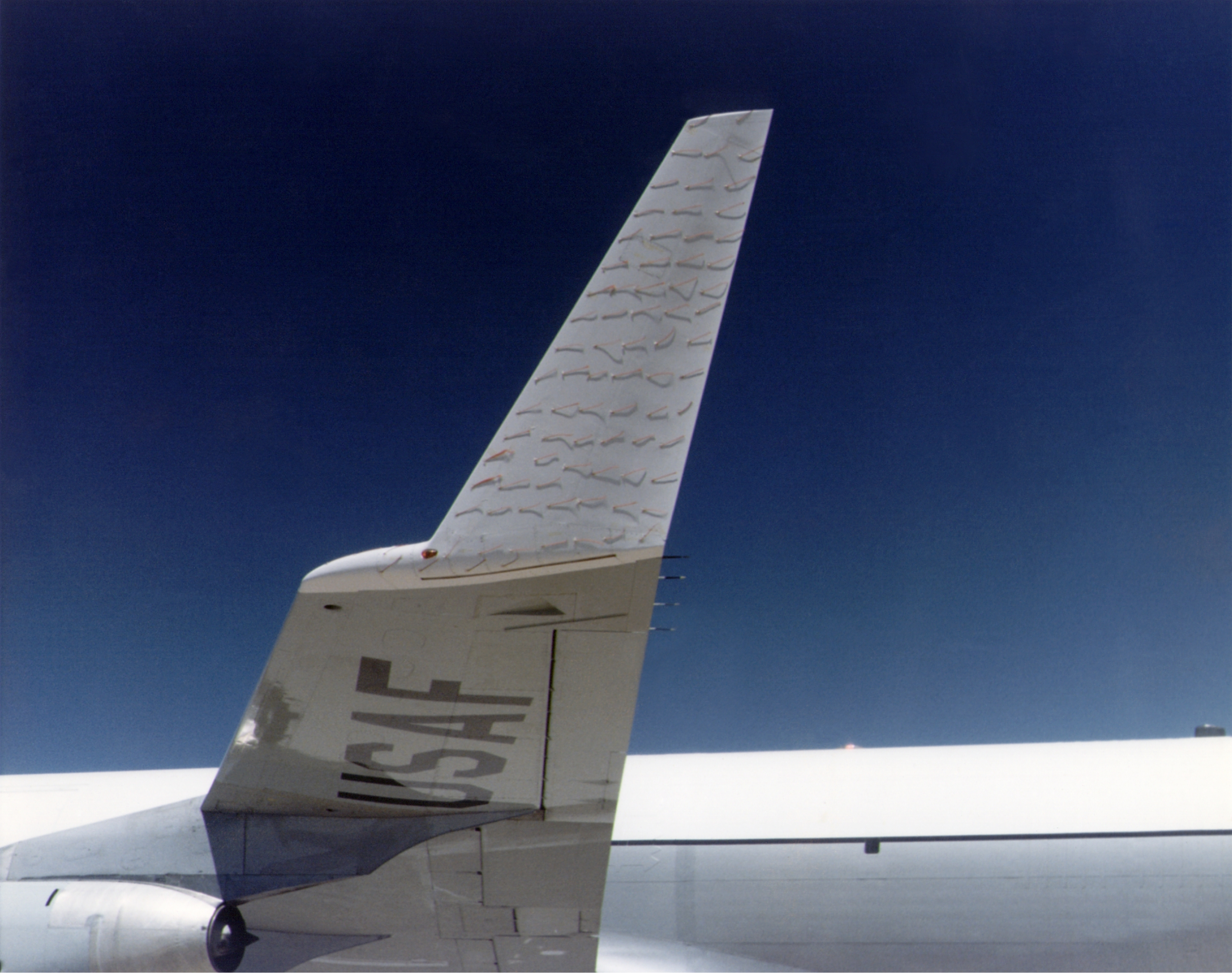
Winglet on KC-135 Stratotanker with attached tufts showing airflow during NASA tests in 1979–1980

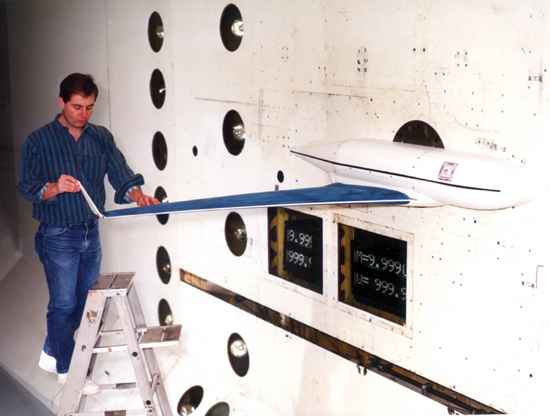
Gulfstream V model winglet flutter tests at NASA Langley transonic wind tunnel

The term "winglet" was previously used to describe an additional lifting surface on an aircraft, like a short section between wheels on fixed undercarriage. Richard Whitcomb's research in the 1970s at NASA first used winglet with its modern meaning referring to near-vertical extension of the wing tips.

Another potential benefit of winglets is that they reduce the intensity of wake vortices. Those trail behind the plane and pose a hazard to trailing aircraft, such as a smaller plane taking off (or landing) after a larger plane. Minimum spacing requirements between aircraft operations at airports are largely dictated by these factors. Aircraft are classified by weight (e.g., "Light", "Heavy", etc.) because the vortex strength grows with the aircraft lift coefficient, and thus, the associated turbulence is greatest at low speed and high weight, which produces a high angle of attack.

Winglets and wingtip fences also increase efficiency by reducing vortex interference with laminar airflow near the tips of the wing, by 'moving' the confluence of low-pressure (over wing) and high-pressure (under wing) air away from the surface of the wing. Wingtip vortices create turbulence, originating at the leading edge of the wingtip and propagating backwards and inboard. This turbulence 'delaminates' the airflow over a small triangular section of the outboard wing, which destroys lift in that area. The fence/winglet drives the area where the vortex forms upward away from the wing surface, since the center of the resulting vortex is now at the tip of the winglet.

The fuel economy improvement from winglets increases with the mission length. Blended winglets allow a steeper angle of attack, thus reducing takeoff distance.

=== Early development ===
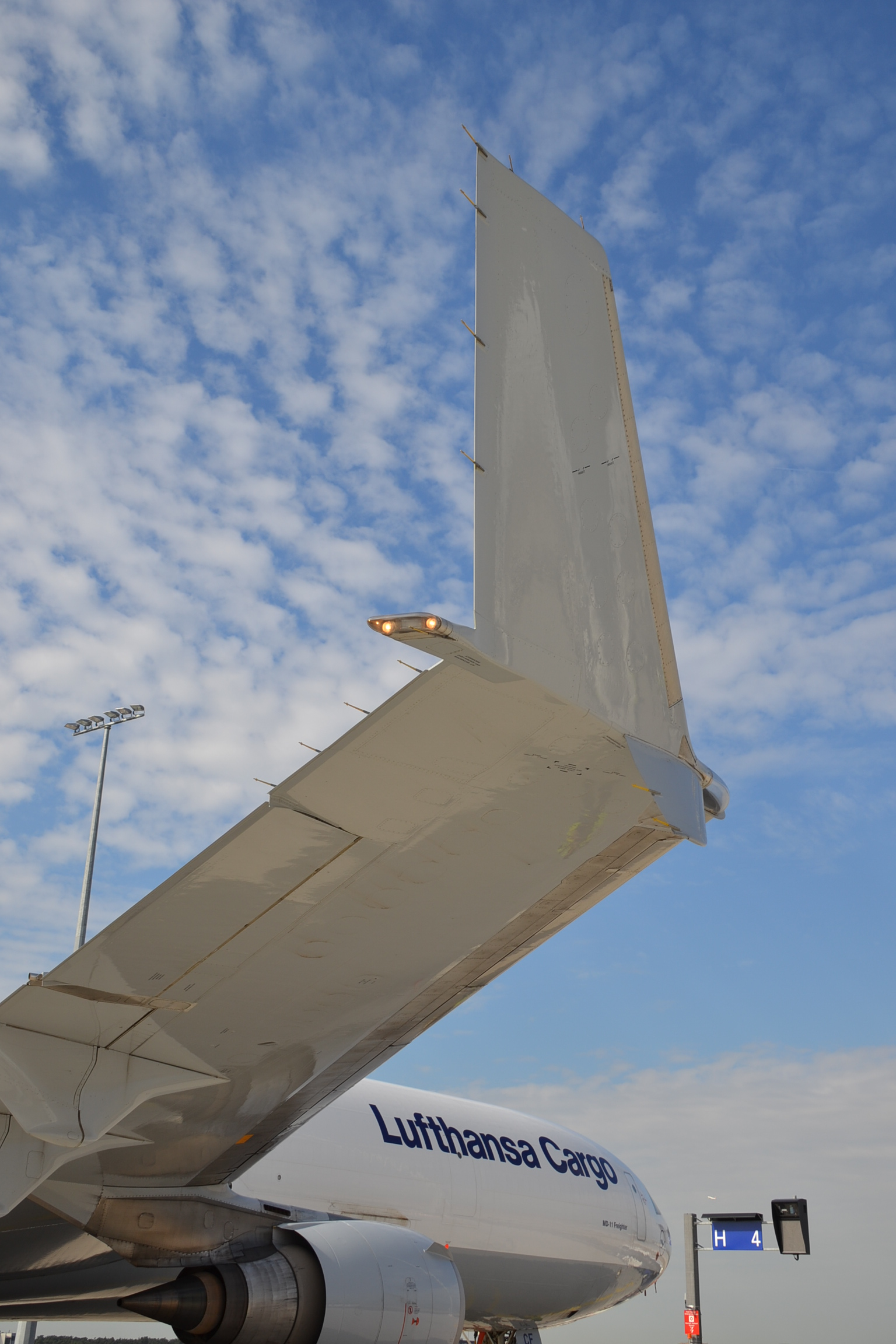
Winglet of McDonnell Douglas MD-11F

Richard T. Whitcomb, an engineer at NASA's Langley Research Center, further developed Hoerner's concept in response to the sharp increase in the cost of fuel after the 1973 oil crisis. With careful aeronautical design he showed that, for a given bending moment, a near-vertical winglet offers a greater drag reduction compared to a horizontal span extension. Whitcomb was the first to realize a net benefit in drag reduction by careful design to keep profile drag to a minimum.

Whitcomb's designs were flight-tested in 1979–80 by a joint NASA/Air Force team, using a KC-135 Stratotanker based at the Dryden Flight Research Center. A Lockheed L-1011 and McDonnell Douglas DC-10 were also used for testing, and the latter design was directly implemented by McDonnell Douglas on the derivative MD-11, which was rolled out in 1990.

In May 1983, a high school student at Bowie High School in Maryland won a grand prize at the 34th International Science and Engineering Fair in Albuquerque, New Mexico, for the result of his research on wingtip devices to reduce drag. The same month, he filed a U.S. patent for "wingtip airfoils", published in 1986.

=== Implementations ===
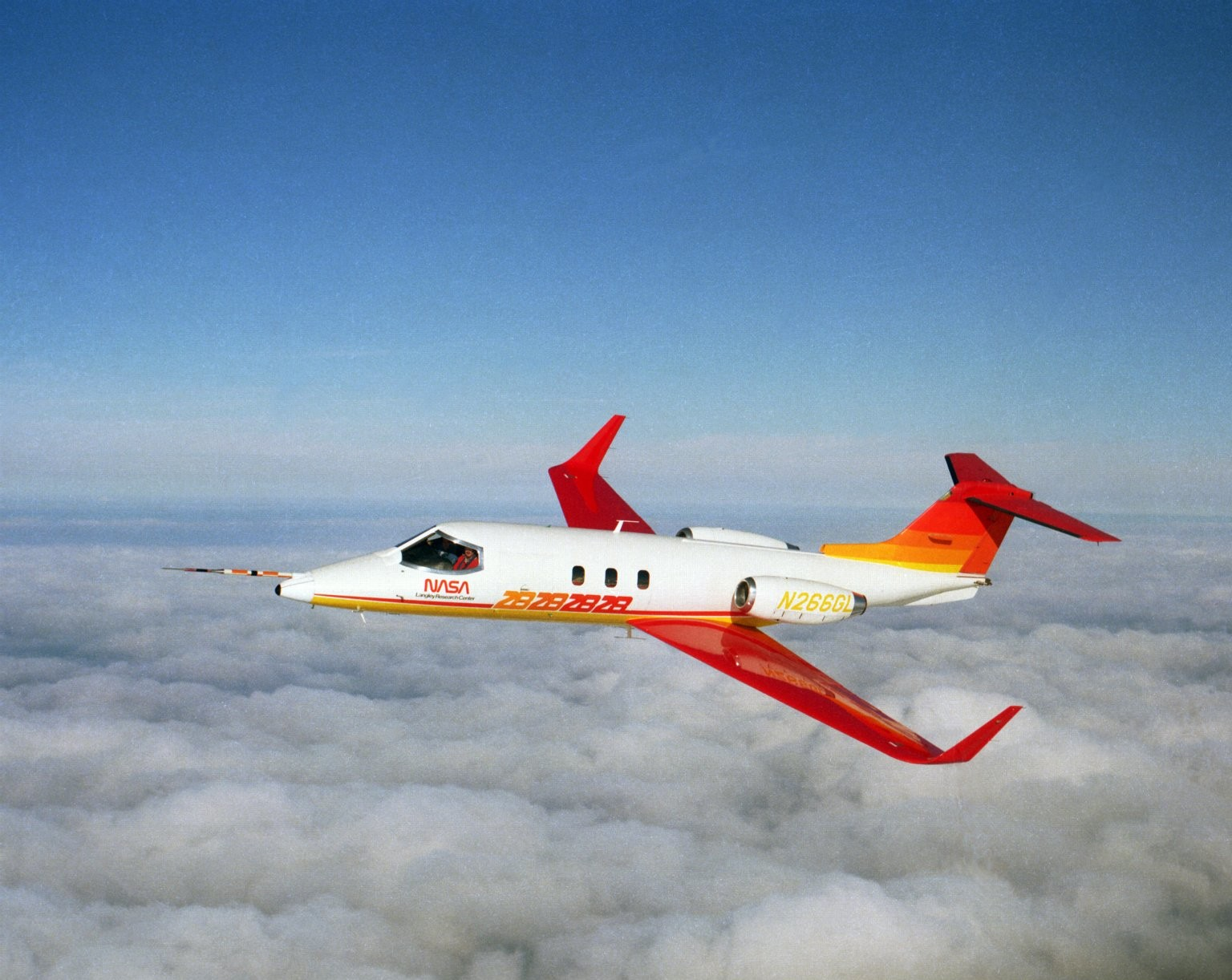
A Learjet 28/29, the first commercial aircraft with winglets

Learjet exhibited the prototype Learjet 28 at the 1977 National Business Aviation Association convention. It employed the first winglets ever used on a production aircraft, either civilian or military. Learjet developed the winglet design without NASA assistance. Although the Model 28 was intended to be a prototype experimental aircraft, performance was such that it resulted in a production commitment from Learjet. Flight tests showed that the winglets increased range by about 6.5 percent and improved directional stability. Learjet's application of winglets to production aircraft continued with newer models including the Learjet 55, 31, 60, 45, and Learjet 40.

Gulfstream Aerospace explored winglets in the late 1970s and incorporated winglets in the Gulfstream III, Gulfstream IV and Gulfstream V. The Gulfstream V range of 6,500 nmi (12,000 km) allows nonstop routes such as New York–Tokyo, it holds over 70 world and national flight records. Burt Rutan combined winglets and vertical stabilizers, which appeared on his Beechcraft Starship business aircraft design that first flew in 1986.

Winglets are also applied to other business aircraft, reducing take-off distance to operate from smaller airports, and allowing higher cruise altitudes. Along winglets on new designs, aftermarket vendors developed retrofits. Winglet Technology, LLC of Wichita, Kansas should have tested its elliptical winglets designed to increase payload-range on hot and high departures to retrofit the Citation X.

Conventional winglets were fitted to Rutan's Rutan Voyager, the first aircraft to circumnavigate the world without refueling in 1986. The aircraft's wingtips were damaged, however, when they dragged along the runway during takeoff, removing about 1 foot (30 cm) from each wingtip, so the flight was made without benefit of winglets.

==== Wingtip fence ====
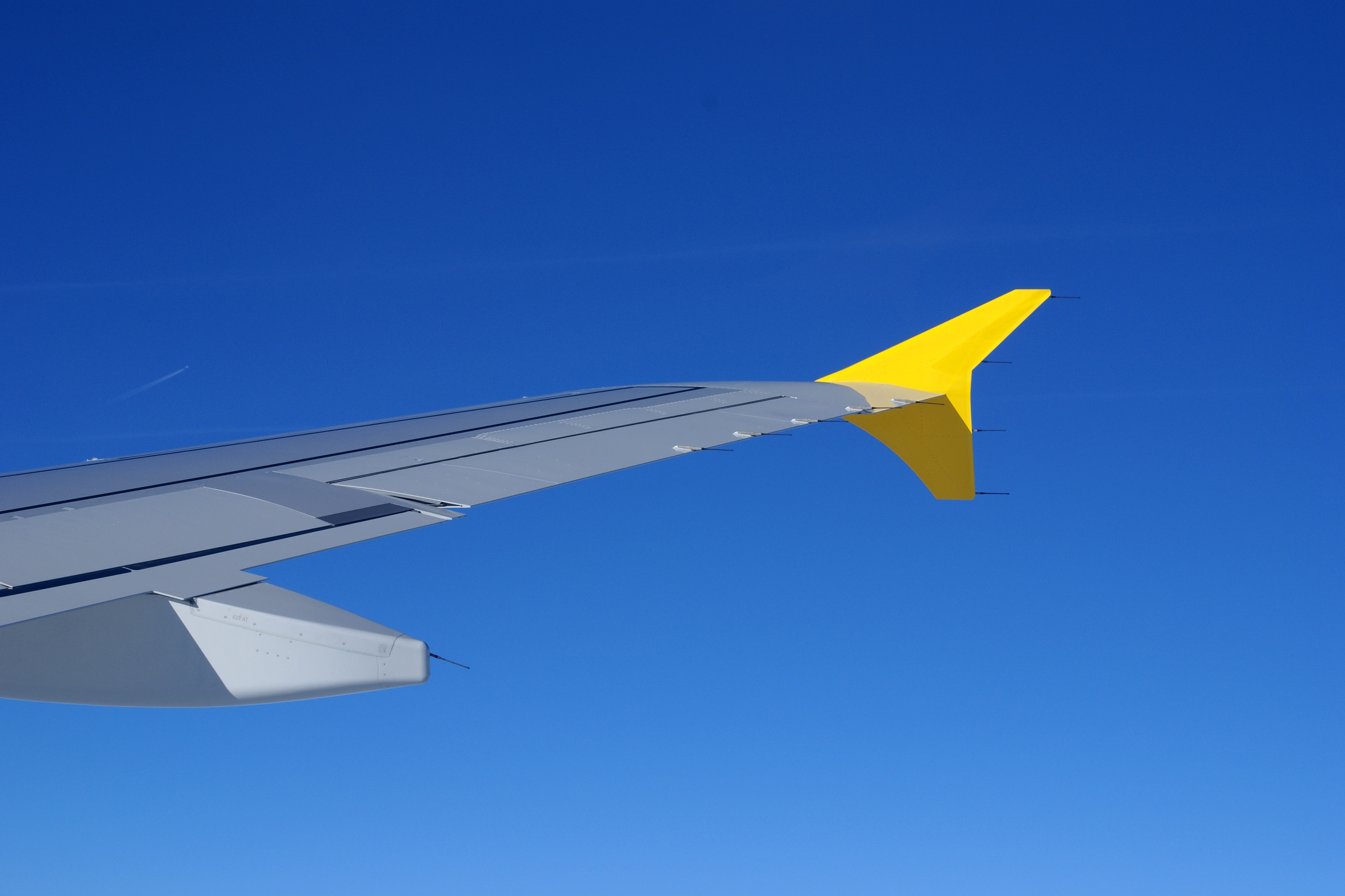
Wingtip fences are featured on most Airbus legacy models.

A wingtip fence refers to the winglets including surfaces extending both above and below the wingtip, as described in Whitcomb's early research. Both surfaces are shorter than or equivalent to a winglet possessing similar aerodynamic benefits. The Airbus A310-300 was the first airliner with wingtip fences in 1985. Other Airbus models followed with the A300-600, the A320ceo, and the A380. Other Airbus models including the Airbus A320 Enhanced, A320neo, A350 and A330neo have blended winglets rather than wingtip fences. The Antonov An-158 uses wingtip fences.

==== Canted winglets ====
Boeing announced a new version of the 747, the 747-400, in 1985, with an extended range and capacity, using a combination of winglets and increased span to carry the additional load. The winglets increased the 747-400's range by 3.5% over the 747-300, which is otherwise aerodynamically identical but has no winglets. The 747-400D variant lacks the wingtip extensions and winglets included on other 747-400s since winglets would provide minimal benefits on short-haul routes while adding extra weight and cost, although the -400D may be converted to the long-range version if needed. Winglets are preferred for Boeing derivative designs based on existing platforms, because they allow maximum re-use of existing components. Newer designs are favoring increased span, other wingtip devices or a combination of both, whenever possible.

The Ilyushin Il-96 was the first Russian and modern jet to feature winglets in 1988. The Bombardier CRJ-100/200 was the first regional airliner to feature winglets in 1992. The A340/A330 followed with canted winglets in 1993/1994. The Tupolev Tu-204 was the first narrowbody aircraft to feature winglets in 1994. The Airbus A220 (née CSeries), from 2016, has canted winglets.

==== Blended winglets ====
A blended winglet is attached to the wing with a smooth curve instead of a sharp angle and is intended to reduce interference drag at the wing/winglet junction. A sharp interior angle in this region can interact with the boundary layer flow causing a drag-inducing vortex, negating some of the benefit of the winglet. Seattle-based Aviation Partners develops blended winglets as retrofits for the Gulfstream II, Hawker 800 and the Falcon 2000.

On February 18, 2000, blended winglets were announced as an option for the Boeing 737-800; the first shipset was installed on 14 February 2001 and entered revenue service with Hapag-Lloyd Flug on 8 May 2001. The Aviation Partners/Boeing 8 ft (2.4 m) extensions decrease fuel consumption by 4% for long-range flights and increase range by 130 or 200 nmi (240 or 370 km) for the 737-800 or the derivative Boeing Business Jet as standard. Also offered for the 737 Classic, many operators have retrofitted their fleets with these for the fuel savings. Aviation Partners Boeing also offers blended winglets for the 757 and 767-300ER. In 2006, Airbus tested two candidate blended winglets, designed by Winglet Technology and Airbus for the Airbus A320 family. In 2009, Airbus launched its "Sharklet" blended winglet, designed to enhance the payload-range of its A320 family and reduce fuel burn by up to 4% over longer sectors. This corresponds to an annual CO_{2} reduction of 700 tonnes per aircraft. The A320s fitted with Sharklets were delivered beginning in 2012. They are used on the A320neo, the A330neo and the A350. They are also offered as a retrofit option.

==== Raked wingtip ====
Raked wingtips, where the tip has a greater wing sweep than the rest of the wing, are featured on some Boeing Commercial Airplanes and Embraer aircraft to improve fuel efficiency, takeoff and climb performance. Like winglets, they increase the effective wing aspect ratio and diminish wingtip vortices, decreasing lift-induced drag. In testing by Boeing and NASA, they reduce drag by as much as 5.5%, compared to 3.5% to 4.5% for conventional winglets. While an increase in span would be more effective than a same-length winglet, its bending moment is greater. A 3 ft (91 cm) winglet gives the performance gain of a 2 ft (61 cm) span increase but has the bending force of a 1 ft (30 cm) span increase.

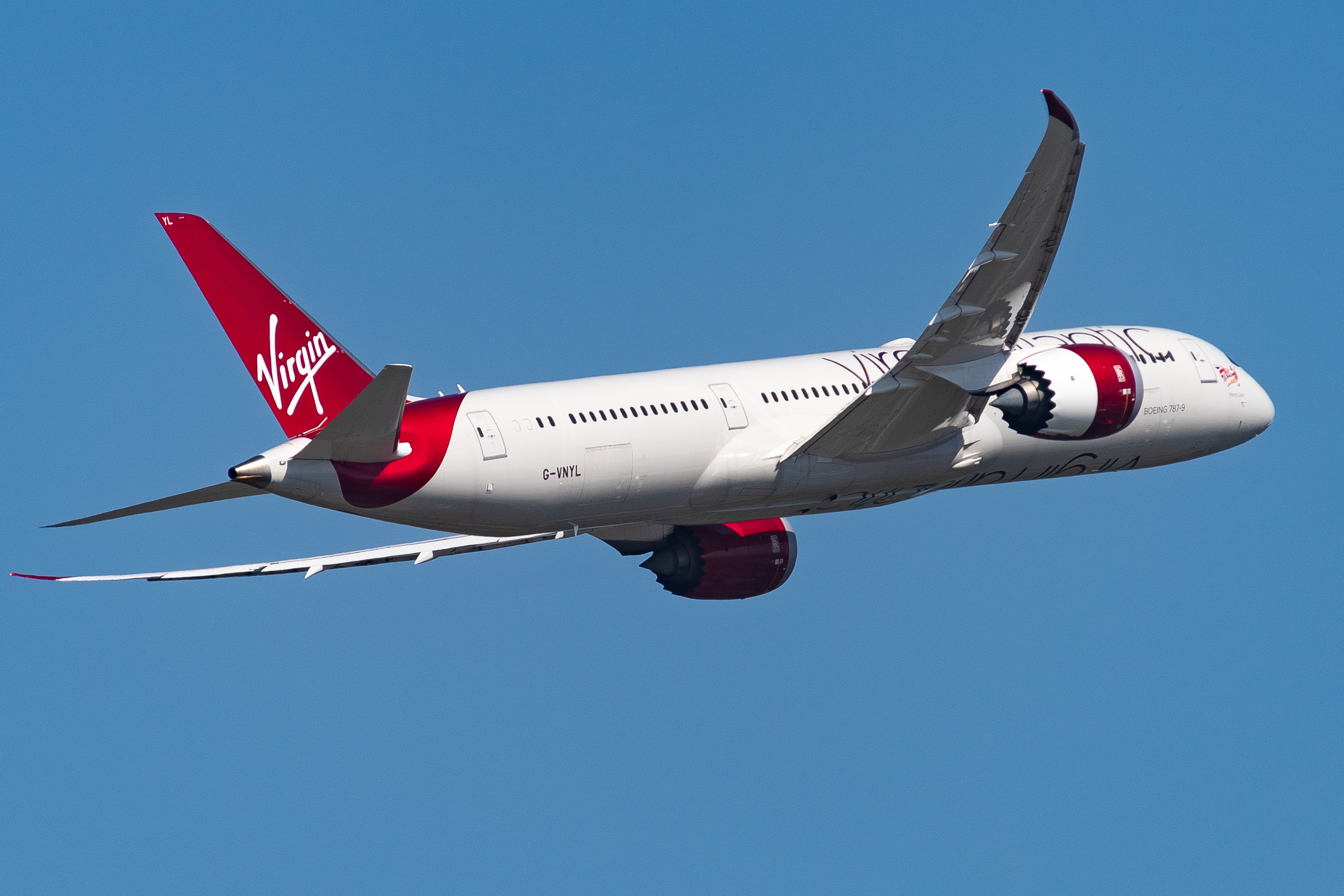
Raked wingtips on a Boeing 787 Dreamliner

Raked wingtips offer several weight-reduction advantages relative to simply extending the conventional main wingspan. At high load-factor structural design conditions, the smaller chords of the wingtip are subjected to less load, and they result in less induced loading on the outboard main wing. Additionally, the leading-edge sweep results in the center of pressure being located farther aft than for simple extensions of the span of conventional main wings. At high load factors, this relative aft location of the center of pressure causes the raked wingtip to be twisted more leading-edge down, reducing the bending moment on the inboard wing. However, the relative aft-movement of the center of pressure accentuates flutter.

Raked wingtips are installed on the Boeing 767-400ER (first flight on October 9, 1999), -200LR/-300ER/F variants of Boeing 777 (June 12, 1994) including the upcoming 777X, the 737-derived Boeing P-8 Poseidon (25 April 2009), all variants of the Boeing 787 (December 15, 2009) (the cancelled Boeing 787-3 would have had a 170 ft (51.7 m) wingspan to fit in ICAO Aerodrome Reference Code D, as its wingspan was decreased by using blended winglets instead of raked wingtips), and the Boeing 747-8 (February 8, 2010). The Embraer E-jet E2 and C-390 Millennium wings also have raked wingtips.

==== Split-tip ====
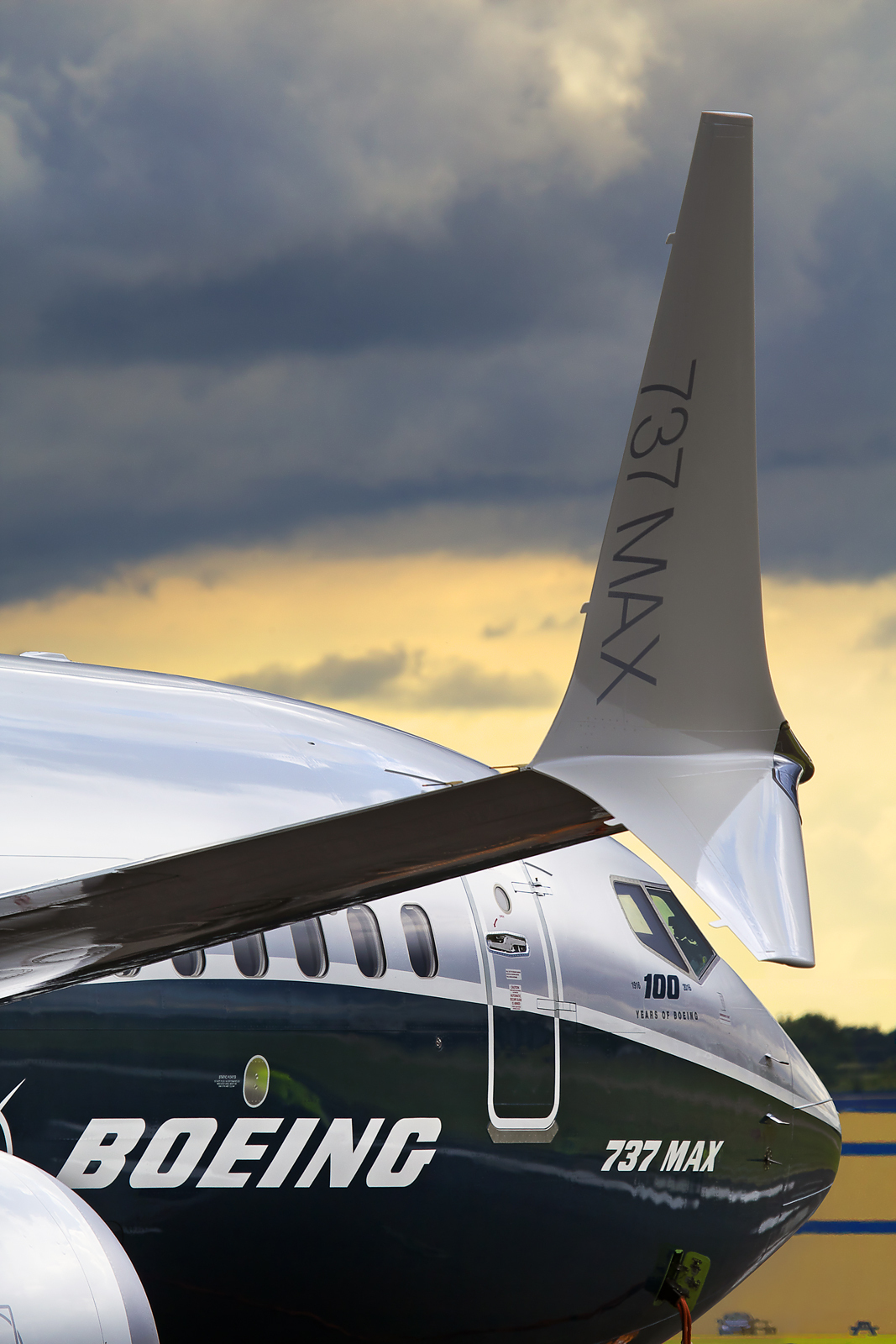
737 MAX split-tip winglet

The McDonnell Douglas MD-11 was the first aircraft with split-tip winglets in 1990.

For the 737 Next Generation, third-party vendor Aviation Partners has introduced a similar design to the 737 MAX wingtip device known as the split scimitar winglet, with United Airlines as the launch customer.

The Boeing 737 MAX uses a new type of wingtip device, the Advanced Technology Winglet. Resembling a three-way hybrid of a winglet, wingtip fence, and raked wingtip, Boeing claims that this new design should deliver an additional 1.5% improvement in fuel economy over the 10-12% improvement already expected from the 737 MAX.

==== Gliders ====
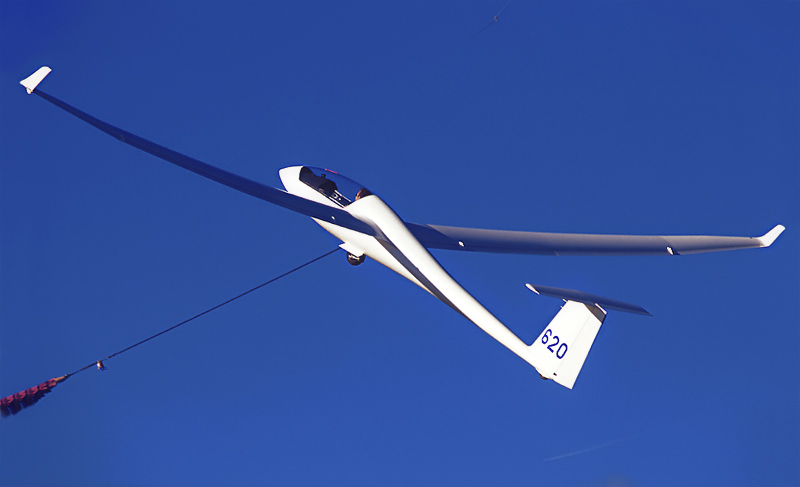
Schempp-Hirth Ventus-2 glider with factory winglets winch-launching

In 1987, mechanical engineer Peter Masak called on aerodynamicist Mark D. Maughmer, an associate professor of aerospace engineering at the Pennsylvania State University, about designing winglets to improve performance on his 15-meter (49 ft) wingspan racing sailplane. Others had attempted to apply Whitcomb's winglets to gliders before, and they did improve climb performance, but this did not offset the parasitic drag penalty in high-speed cruise. Masak was convinced it was possible to overcome this hurdle. By trial and error, they ultimately developed successful winglet designs for gliding competitions, using a new PSU–90–125 airfoil, designed by Maughmer specifically for the winglet application. At the 1991 World Gliding Championships in Uvalde, Texas, the trophy for the highest speed went to a winglet-equipped 15-meter class limited wingspan glider, exceeding the highest speed in the unlimited span Open Class, an exceptional result. Masak went on to win the 1993 U.S. 15 Meter Nationals gliding competition, using winglets on his prototype Masak Scimitar.

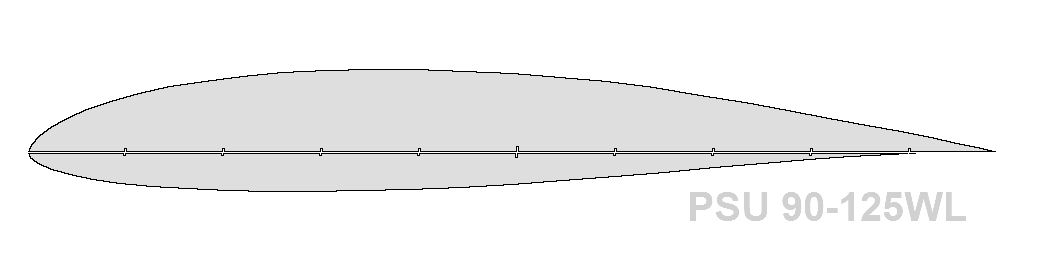
PSU-90-125 winglet airfoil profile

The Masak winglets were originally retrofitted to production sailplanes, but within 10 years of their introduction, most high-performance gliders were equipped from the factory with winglets or other wingtip devices. It took over a decade for winglets to first appear on a production airliner, the original application that was the focus of the NASA development. Yet, once the advantages of winglets were proven in competition, adoption was swift with gliders. The point difference between the winner and the runner-up in soaring competition is often less than one percent, so even a small improvement in efficiency is a significant competitive advantage. Many non-competition pilots fitted winglets for handling benefits such as increased roll rate and roll authority and reduced tendency for wing tip stall. The benefits are notable, because sailplane winglets must be removable to allow the glider to be stored in a trailer, so they are usually installed only at the pilot's preference.

The Glaser-Dirks DG-303, an early glider derivative design, incorporating winglets as factory standard equipment.

== Non-planar wingtip ==
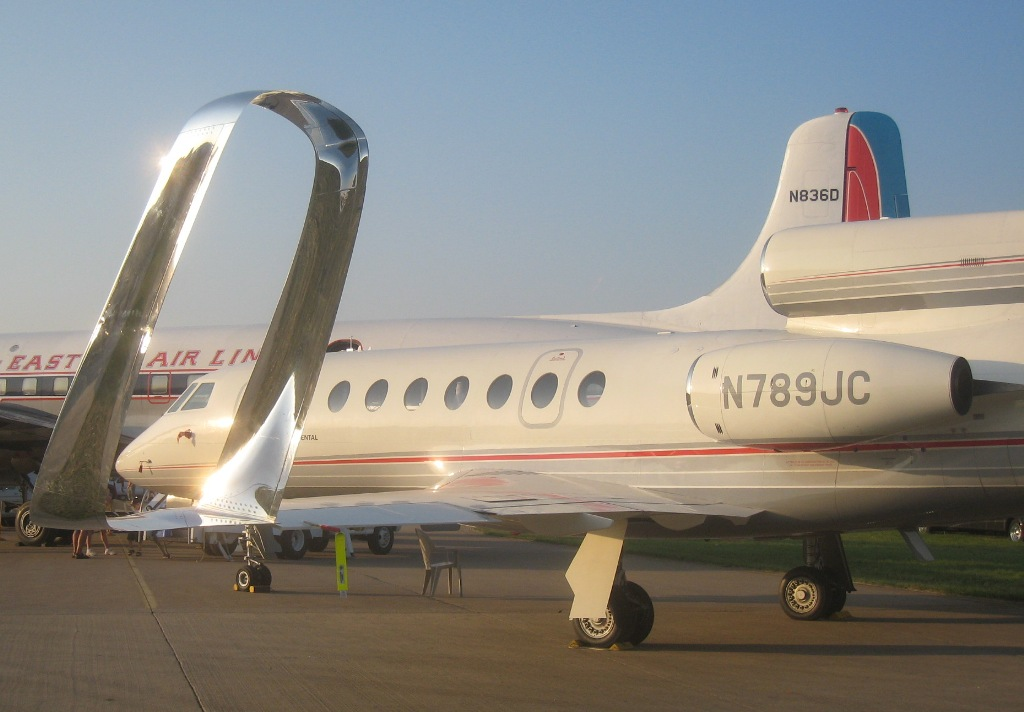
A Falcon 50 with a spiroid winglet

Aviation Partners developed and flight tested a closed-surface Spiroid winglet on a Falcon 50 in 2010.

Non-planar wingtips are normally angled upwards in a polyhedral wing configuration, increasing the local dihedral near the wing tip, with polyhedral wing designs themselves having been popular on free-flight model aircraft designs for decades. Non-planar wingtips provide the wake control benefit of winglets, with less parasitic drag penalty, if designed carefully. The non-planar wing tip is often swept back like a raked wingtip and may also be combined with a winglet. A winglet is also a special case of a non-planar wingtip.

Aircraft designers employed mostly planar wing designs with simple dihedral after World War II, prior to the introduction of winglets. With the wide acceptance of winglets in new sailplane designs of the 1990s, designers sought to further optimize the aerodynamic performance of their wingtip designs. Glider winglets were originally retrofitted directly to planar wings, with only a small, nearly right-angle, transition area. Once the performance of the winglet itself was optimized, attention was turned to the transition between the wing and winglet. A common application was tapering the transition area from the wing tip chord to the winglet chord and raking the transition area back, to place the winglet in the optimal position. If the tapered portion was canted upward, the winglet height could also be reduced. Eventually, designers employed multiple non-planar sections, each canting up at a greater angle, dispensing with the winglets entirely.

The Schempp-Hirth Discus-2 and Schempp-Hirth Duo Discus use non-planar wingtips.

== Active wingtip device ==
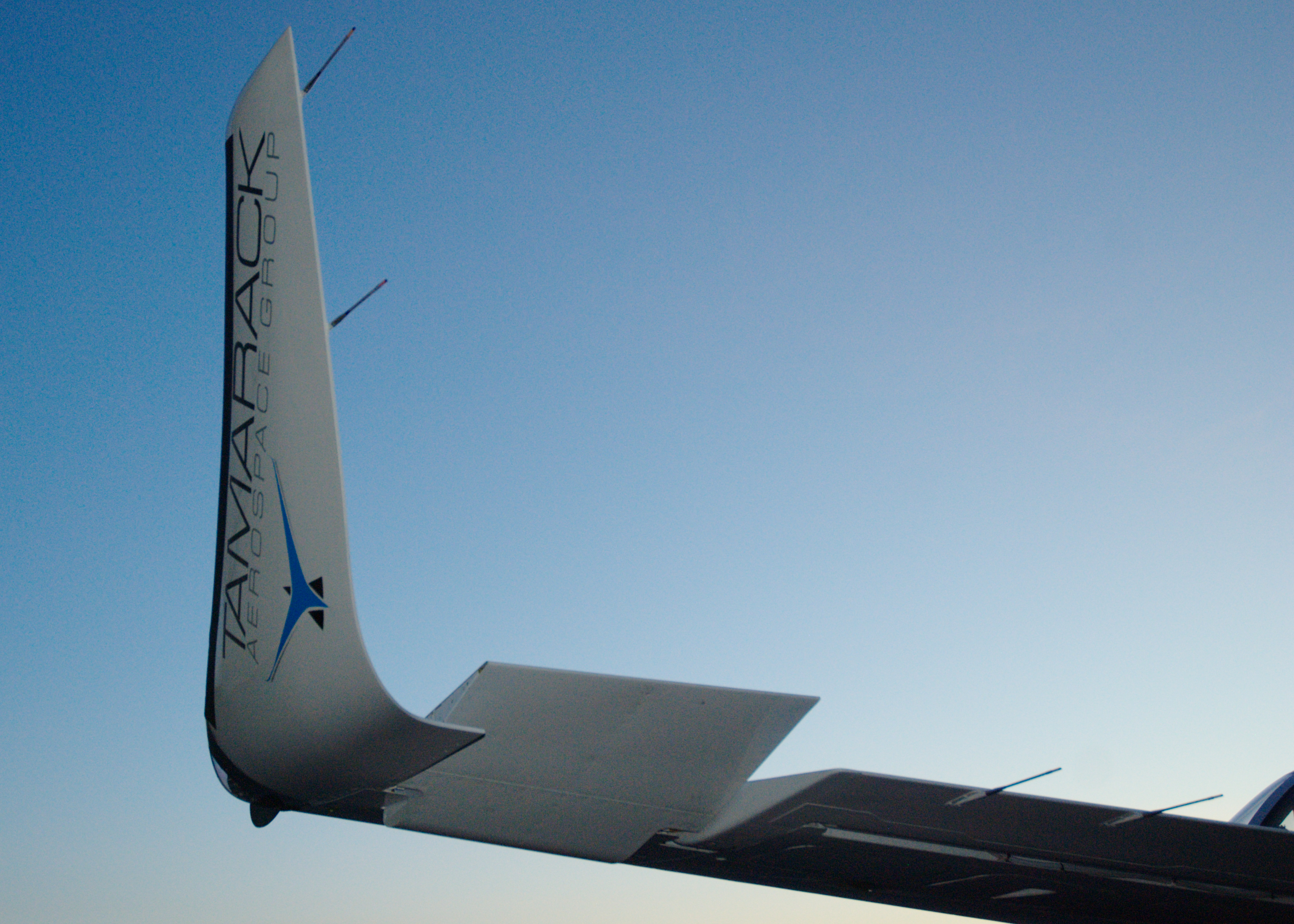
Tamarack Aerospace's active wingtip device

Tamarack Aerospace Group, a company founded in 2010 by aerospace structural engineer Nicholas Guida, has patented an Active Technology Load Alleviation System (ATLAS), a modified version of a wingtip device. The system uses Tamarack Active Camber Surfaces (TACS) to aerodynamically "switch off" the effects of the wingtip device when the aircraft is experiencing high-g events such as large gusts or severe pull-ups. TACS are movable panels, similar to flaps or ailerons, on the trailing edge of the wing extension. The system is controlled by the aircraft's electrical system and a high-speed servo which is activated when the aircraft senses an oncoming stress event, essentially simulating an actuating wingtip. However, the wingtip itself is fixed and the TACS are the only moving part of the wingtip system. Tamarack first introduced ATLAS for the Cessna Citation family aircraft, and it has been certified for use by the Federal Aviation Administration and European Union Aviation Safety Agency.

== Actuating wingtip device ==
There has been research into actuating wingtip devices, including a filed patent application, though no aircraft currently uses this feature as described. The XB-70 Valkyrie's wingtips were capable of drooping downward in flight, to facilitate Mach 3 flight using waveriding.

== Use on rotating blades ==
Wingtip devices are also used on rotating propeller, helicopter rotor, and wind turbine blades to reduce drag, reduce diameter, reduce noise and/or improve efficiency. By reducing aircraft blade tip vortices interacting with the ground surface during taxiing, takeoff, and hover, these devices can reduce damage from dirt and small stones picked up in the vortices.

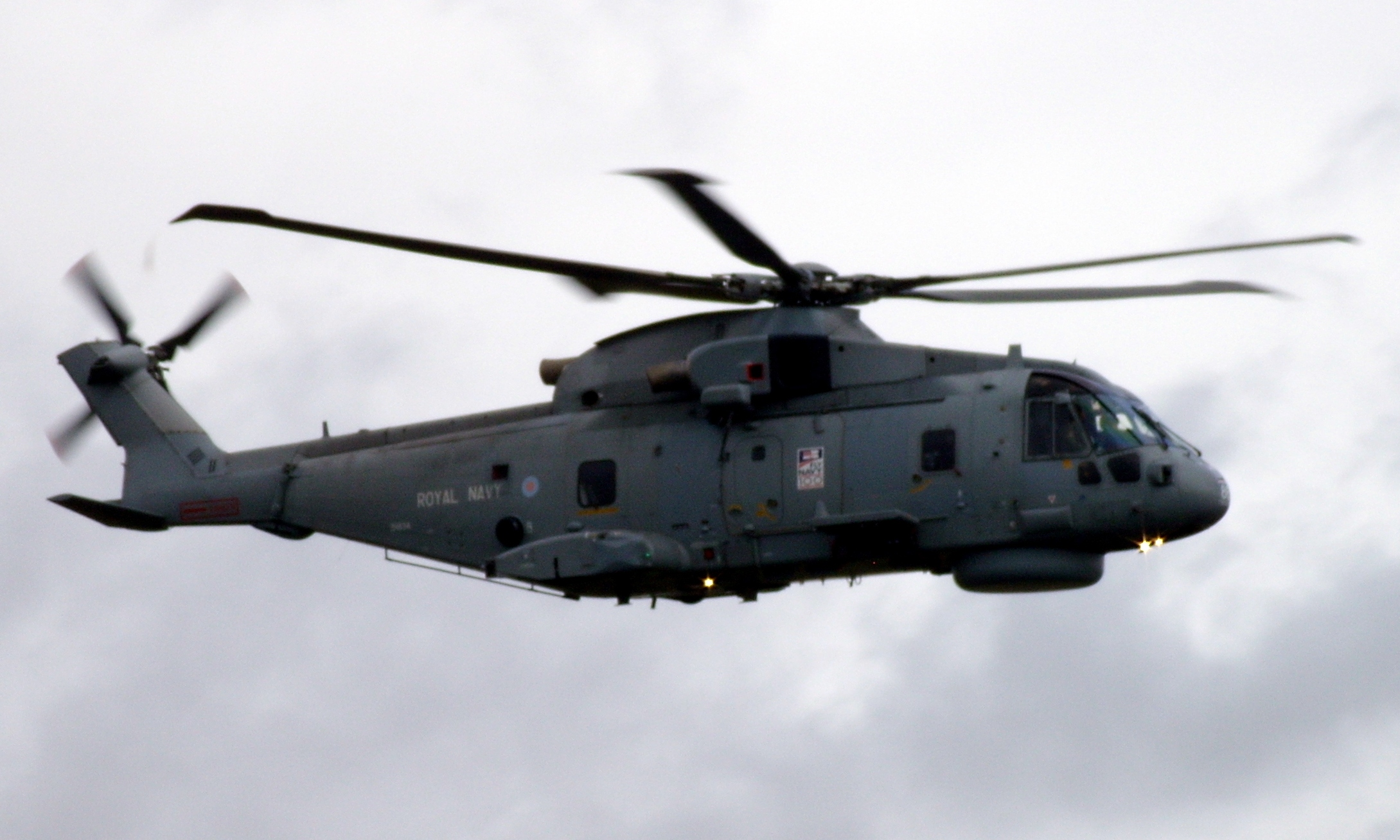
AgustaWestland AW101 Merlin showing BERP rotor with distinctive blade tip profile

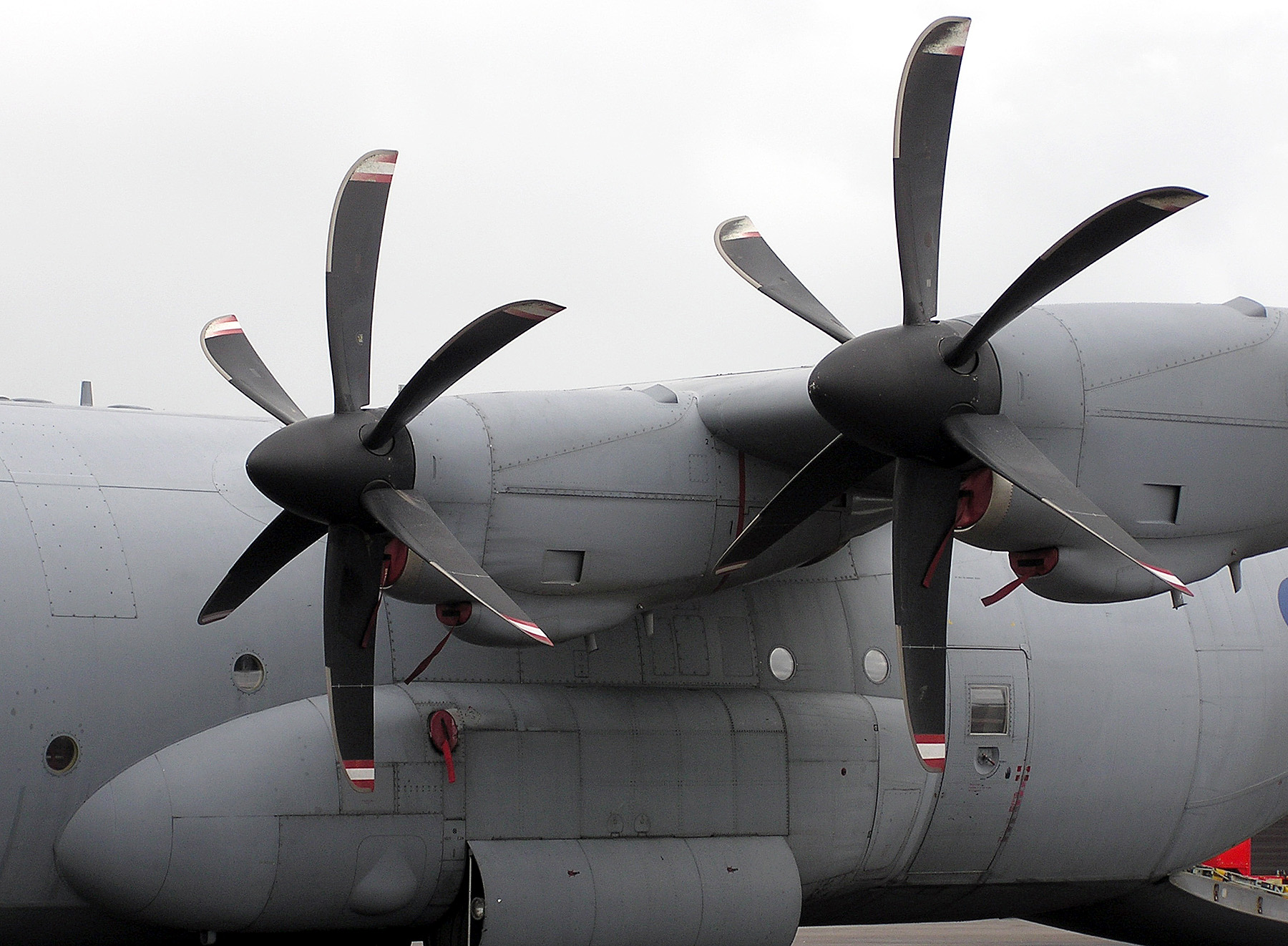
C-130J Super Hercules showing scimitar propellers with raked tips

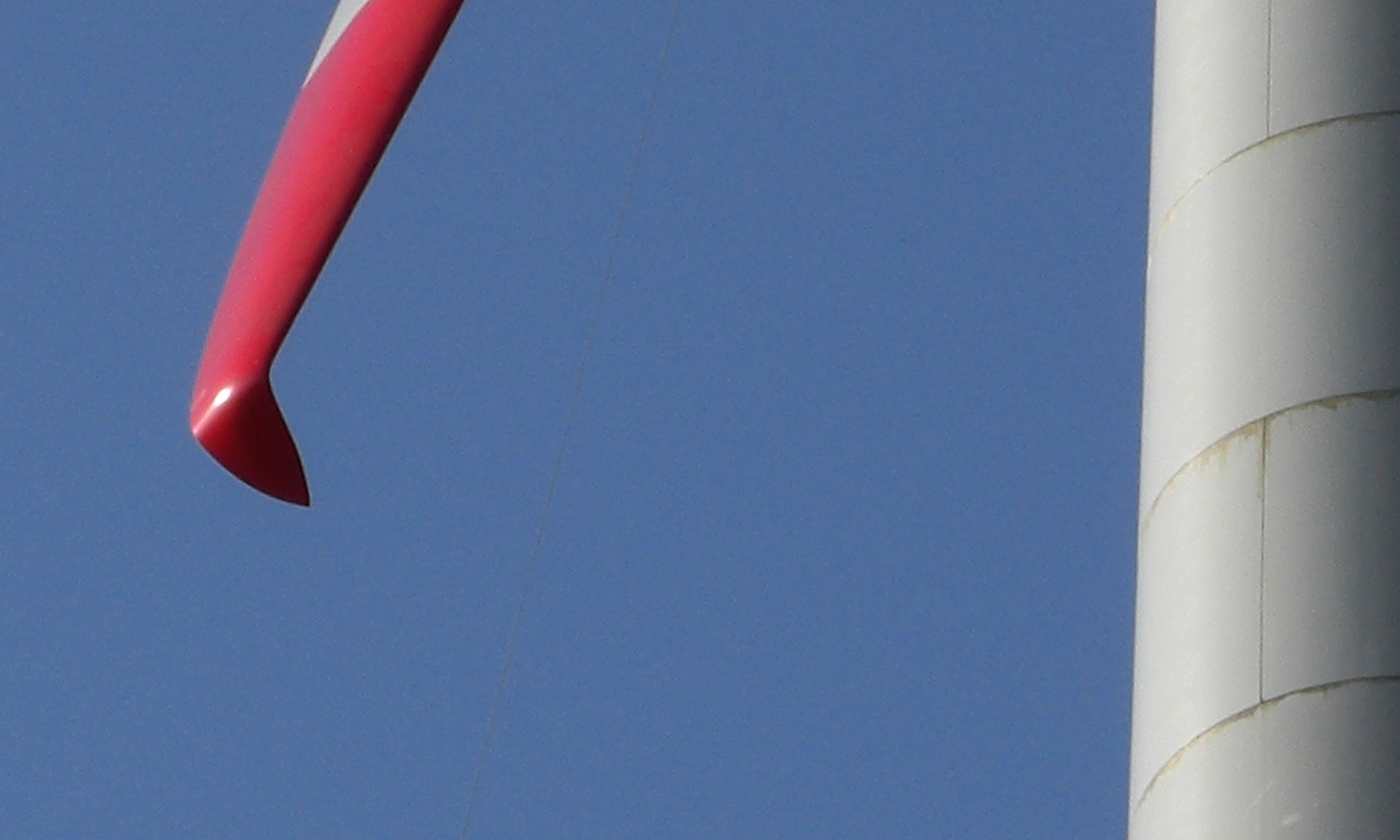
Detail view of the wingtip device on a wind turbine rotor-blade

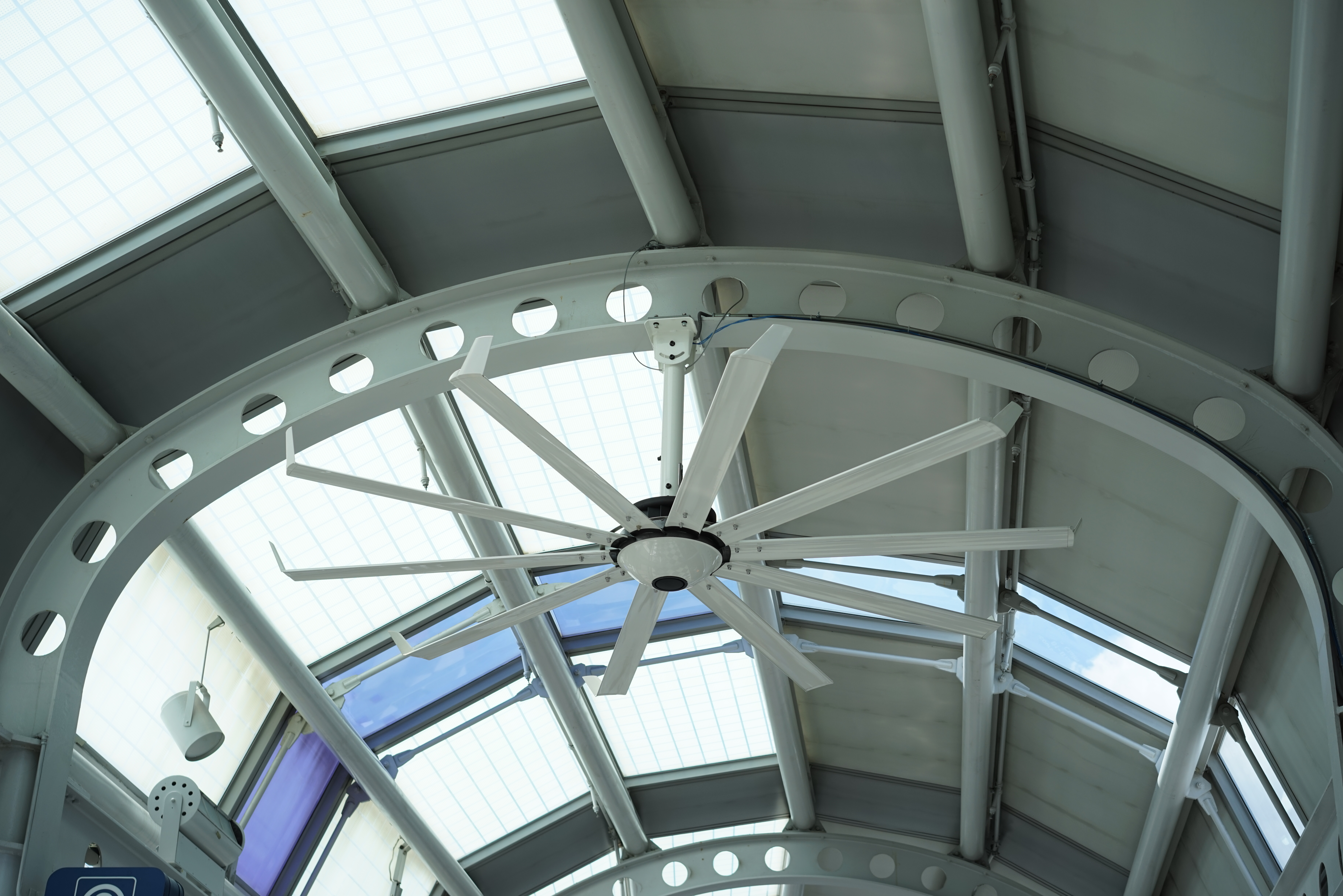
Ceiling fan with wingtip devices

=== Rotorcraft applications ===
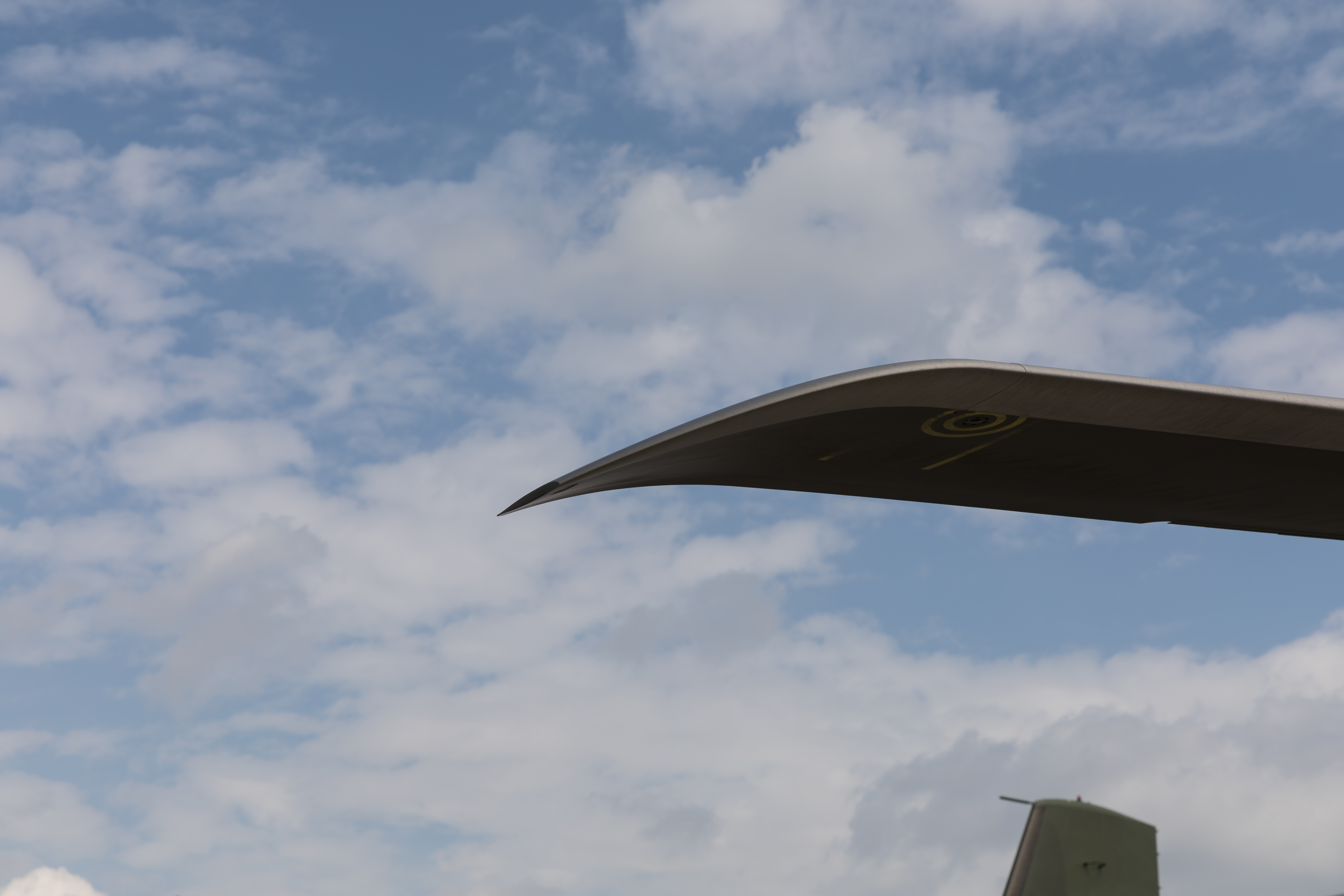
Wingtip device on a NHIndustries NH90

The main rotor blades of the AgustaWestland AW101 (formerly the EH101) have a distinctive tip shape; pilots have found that this rotor design alters the downwash field and reduces brownout which limits visibility in dusty areas and leads to accidents.

=== Propeller applications ===
Hartzell Propeller developed their "Q-tip" propeller used on the Piper PA-42 Cheyenne and several other fixed-wing aircraft types by bending the blade tips back at a 90-degree angle to get the same thrust from a reduced diameter propeller disk; the reduced propeller tip speed reduces noise, according to the manufacturer. Modern scimitar propellers have increased sweepback at the tips, resembling a raked tip on an aircraft wing.

=== Other applications ===
Some ceiling fans have wingtip devices. Fan manufacturer Big Ass Fans has claimed that their Isis fan, equipped with wingtip devices, has superior efficiency. However, for certain high-volume, low-speed designs, wingtip devices may not improve efficiency.

== See also ==
- Oswald efficiency number
