= Schleicher ASW 20 =

German single-seat glider

ASW 20
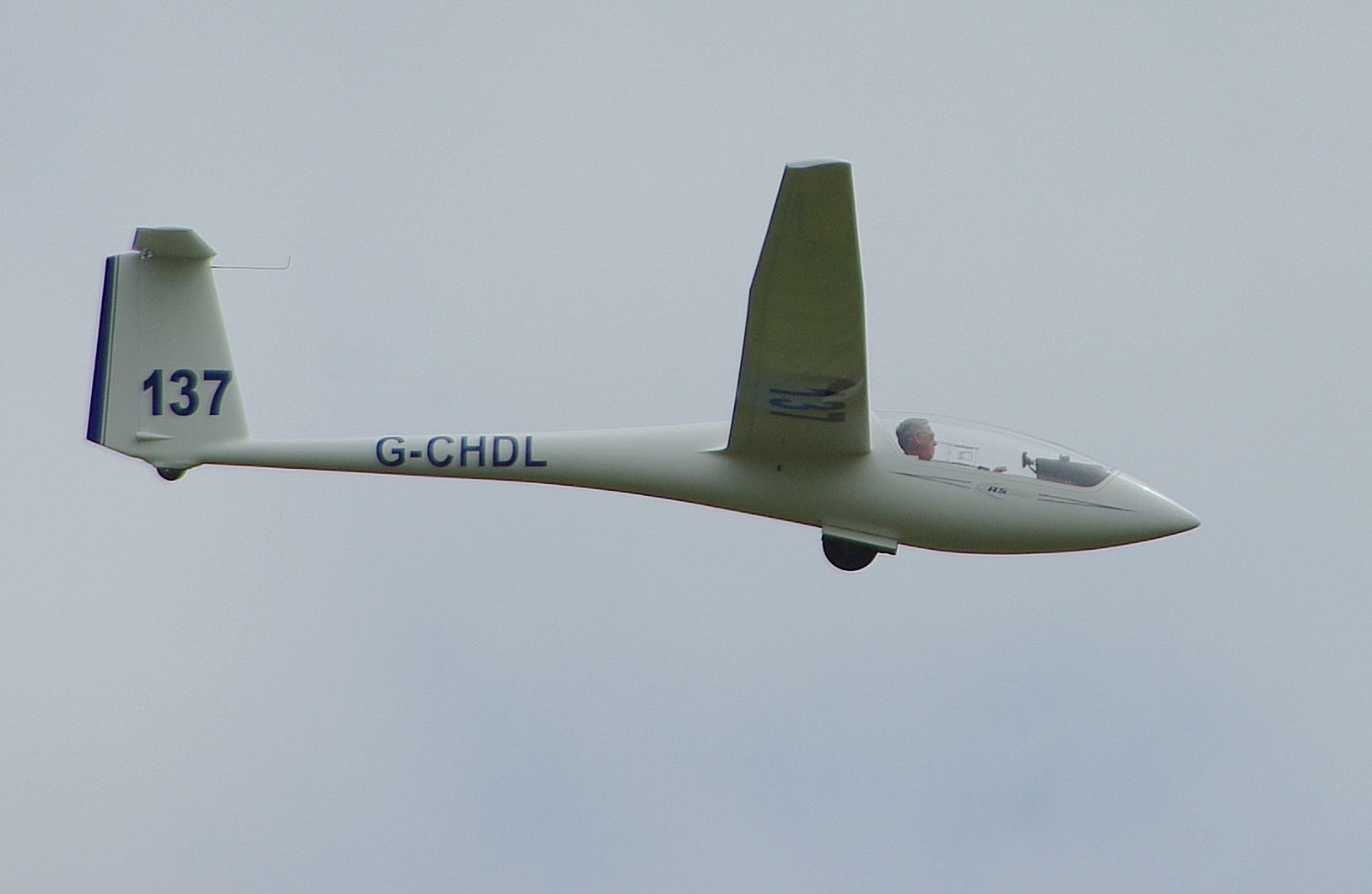

General information
- Type: 15 metre or Sports Class sailplane
- National origin: Germany
- Manufacturer: Schleicher; Centrair (under licence)
- Designer: Gerhard Waibel
- Number built: 905

History
- Introduction date: 1977
- First flight: 1977

The ASW 20 is an FAI 15 metre Class glider designed by Gerhard Waibel and built by Alexander Schleicher GmbH & Co. Its fuselage is nearly identical to that of the ASW 19, mated to newly designed flapped wings for the 15 metre Class. The prototype first flew in 1977. It proved to be a highly successful glider, winning several World Championships, and was still being flown at this level up to 1995. Developments along its production life included winglets, pneumatic turbulators, and wingtip extensions. It remained in production until 1990, when it was superseded by the ASW 27. 765 were built by Schleicher and a further 140 were made under license by Centrair in France.

The ASW 20 was successful in competition, winning numerous world and national championships. Dick Johnson reported that the ASW 20 was the first 15 m glider to demonstrate a measured L/D in excess of 40:1. Roy McMaster, Karl Striedieck and John Seymour won jointly, with others, the world triangle distance record of 1,435 km (892 mi) in 1994 in an ASW 20B. ASW 20s won second and third places in the 15 metre Class at the 1983 World Championships at Hobbs, New Mexico.

== Construction ==
The ASW 20 is constructed from glass-reinforced plastic. It features trailing edge flaps which interconnect with the ailerons and allow the entire trailing edge to operate as a flap between -9 and +5 degrees. The flaps also act as ailerons, but deflect only half of the aileron amount. Schempp-Hirth type airbrakes are provided on the upper wing surface.

The B model (introduced in 1983) differs from the A and C model in that it uses a reinforced wing spar, which provides an increased water ballast capacity at the expense of the flexible wing. The B and C model include several enhancements over the original A model, including a lifting panel, hydraulic disc brake, and automatic elevator hookup. The B and C wings also incorporate a pneumatic turbulator system, which draws high pressure air from pitot inlets on the wing and injects it through approximately 860 pinholes into the boundary layer to control underwing airflow separation.

ASW 20s that include a L designation may be fitted with a 1.59 m wingtip extension. The F designation was assigned to A variants produced in France by Centrair. Centrair also produced an FL variant equivalent to the German ASW20L; most of these are only permitted to fly without the wingtip extensions due to a deficiency in the wing spar construction.

At least three different winglet designs have been produced for the ASW 20, including a NASA winglet fitted to the Centrair gliders (FP), a design by Peter Masak, and a second generation winglet designed by Prof. Mark D. Maughmer of Penn State University (USA).

== Flight characteristics ==
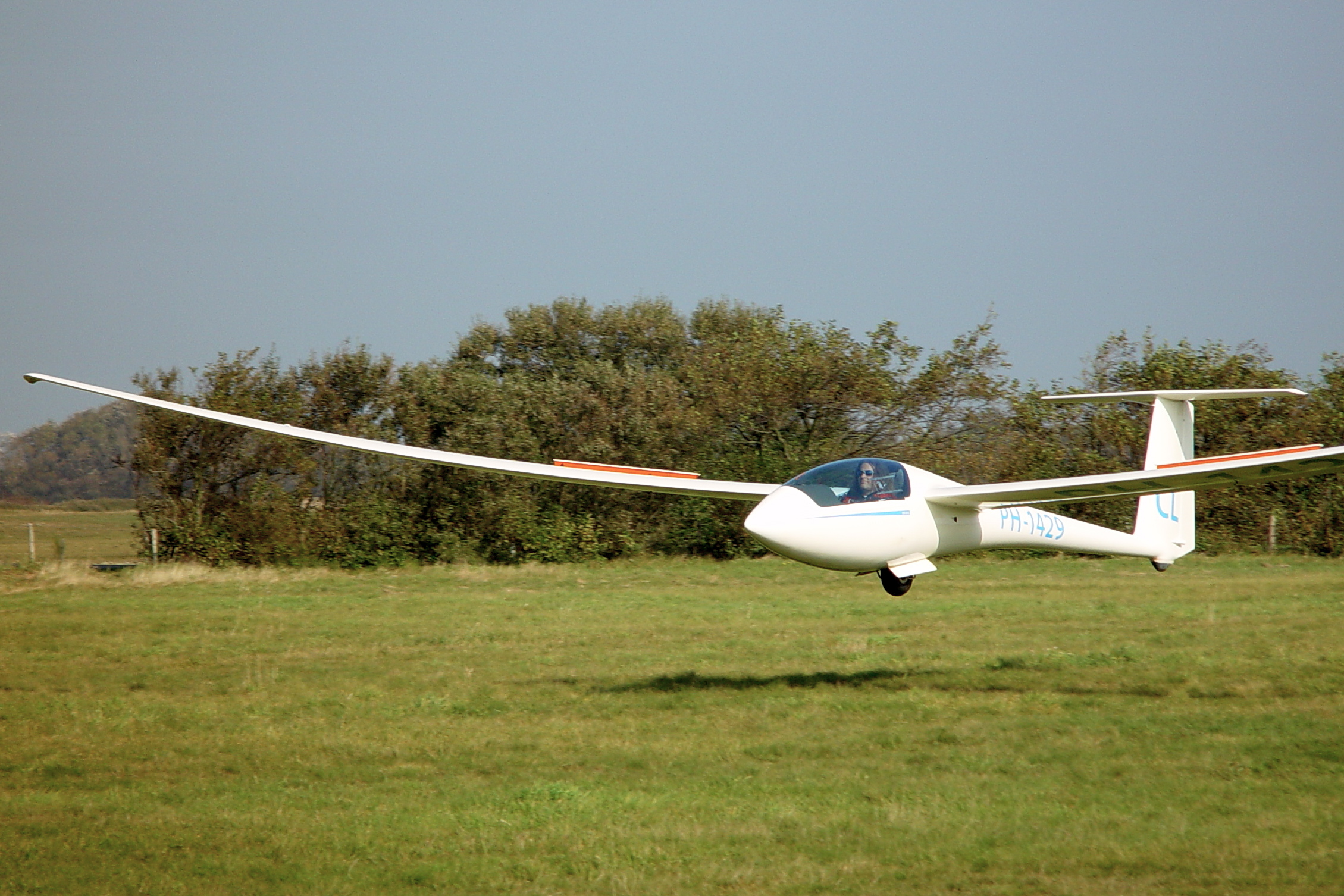
ASW 20 landing

The ASW-20 is known as a very pleasant handling glider in most respects. The wing structure composite layup was designed to twist slightly as the wings flexed upward, resulting in the ability to "store" some of the energy from atmospheric gusts, and then release that energy with a very slight forward thrust force as the wings flexed back downward to their normal position. This concept is known as the Katzmayr Effect, and somewhat mimics a bird's ability to use a flapping motion to propel itself forward in flight. This unique wing twisting movement gave the ASW-20 an ability to make very small but consistent performance gains (or reduced losses) in turbulent and gusty thermal conditions compared to other competition level sailplanes.

The landing flaps (55° in early models, 38° in later models), in conjunction with very effective airbrakes, allow the pilot to make exceptionally steep approaches at slow speeds, permitting very short landings when required. Second generation winglets further improved the handling and reduced drag at low to mid speeds. Thermal performance is comparable to gliders of more modern eras. These characteristics have made the ASW-20 a much beloved and desirable aircraft, even after it was no longer competitive in racing. One very common modification was the insertion of an intermediate flap setting detent (between zero and +1 position) which mitigated or softened any "tip-stall" and associated risk of spinning while thermaling in tight, gusty thermals. The flexible wing of the A and C models is particularly favored for ridge running, where it absorbs some of the tremendous turbulence found at ridgetop.

== Variants ==
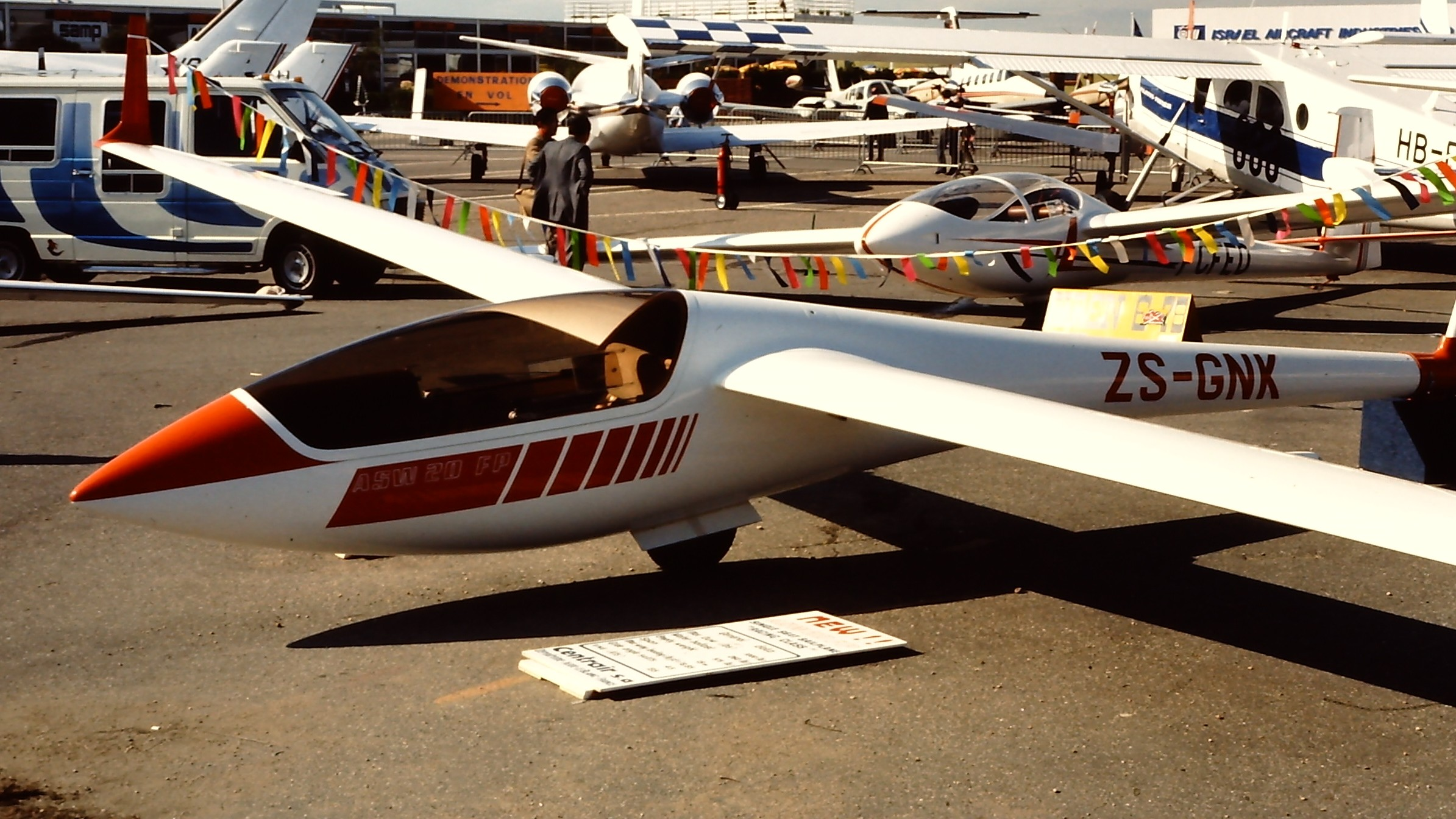
Centrair-built ASW 20 FP in 1980

ASW20
Prototype and initial production
ASW20L
the ASW20 with detachable outer wing extensions to 16.59 m (54.4 ft) span, to compete in the Open-class.
ASW20B
ASW20BL
the ASW20B with detachable outer wing extensions to 16.59 m (54.4 ft) span, to compete in the Open-class.
ASW20C
ASW20CL
the ASW20C with detachable outer wing extensions to 16.59 m (54.4 ft) span, to compete in the Open-class.
ASW20CLT
Open-class glider with PSR T01 turbojet sustainer
ASW20F
ASW20A produced in France by Centrair
ASW20FP
The ASW20F with NASA winglets designed to improve performance in weak conditions.
Z-20
Brazilian Air Force designation of the ASW 20.

== Specifications (ASW 20B) ==
Data from Jane's All the World's Aircraft 1988–89

General characteristics

- Crew: 1
- Length: 6.82 m (22 ft 5 in)
- Wingspan: 15 m (49 ft 3 in)
- Height: 1.45 m (4 ft 9 in)
- Wing area: 10.5 m^{2} (113 sq ft)
- Aspect ratio: 21.4
- Airfoil: root:Wortmann FX-63-131-K; tip:Wortmann FX-60-126
- Empty weight: 260 kg (573 lb)
- Max takeoff weight: 525 kg (1,157 lb)
- Water ballast: 150 L (40 US gal; 33 imp gal)

Performance

- Stall speed: 65 km/h (40 mph, 35 kn) (without ballast)
- Never exceed speed: 280 km/h (170 mph, 150 kn) in smooth air
- g limits: +5.3 -2.65
- Maximum glide ratio: 42.5 at 100 km/h (54 kn; 62 mph) (without ballast); 43 at 120 km/h (65 kn; 75 mph) (with ballast)
- Rate of sink: 0.59 m/s (116 ft/min) at 84 km/h (45 kn; 52 mph) (without ballast)
- Wing loading: 50 kg/m^{2} (10 lb/sq ft)

== See also ==
Related lists

- List of gliders
