= Masak =

Masak may refer to:

== People ==
- Joanie Alice Masak French (b. 1995), Inuit-Irish-Canadian singer granddaughter of Alice Masak French
- Alice Masak French (1930–2013), Inuit-Canadian author
- Peter Masak (1957–2004), Canadian-American aviator
- Ron Masak (1936–2022), American actor

== Other uses ==
- mashak, a South Asian bagpipe
- Masak Scimitar, an American glider designed by Peter Masak
- Financial Crimes Investigation Board (Turkey), organization of Turkey
