= Mark D. Maughmer =

Professor of Aerospace Engineering (born 1950)

- Education: University of Illinois, 1983
- Known for: Aerodynamics, Winglet Design
- Scientific career
- Workplaces: Pennsylvania State University

Mark D. Maughmer (born January 18, 1950) is a professor of Aerospace Engineering in the Department of Aerospace Engineering at The Pennsylvania State University. He is a widely published author known throughout the world as one of the leading aerodynamicists, especially in the areas of airfoil and winglet design and analysis, wing optimization, natural laminar flow aerodynamics, and subsonic, low turbulence wind-tunnel design and operation.

== Winglets ==
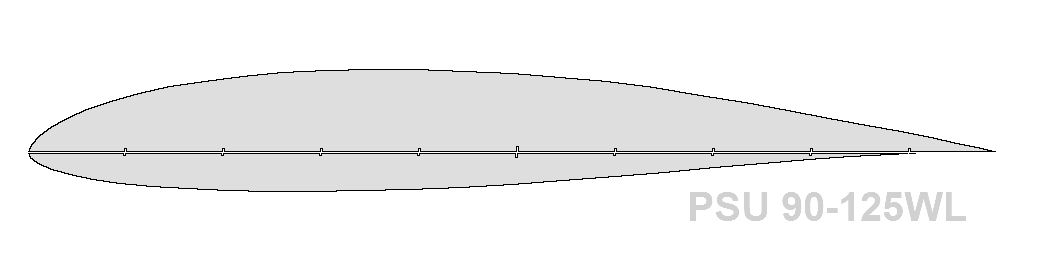
PSU 90-125 winglet airfoil profile

In 1987, Peter Masak called on Maughmer about designing winglets for his sailplane to improve performance. Others had attempted to apply Richard T. Whitcomb's NASA winglets to gliders, and though they did improve climb performance, this did not offset the parasite drag penalty in high speed cruise. Masak was convinced it was possible to overcome this hurdle, and Maughmer was willing to join his quest.

By trial and error, they ultimately developed successful winglet designs for gliding competitions, and at the 1991 World Gliding Championships in Uvalde, Texas, the trophy for the highest speed went to a winglet equipped 15-meter class limited wingspan glider, exceeding the highest speed in the unlimited span Open Class, an exceptional result.

The winglets were originally retrofit to production sailplanes, but now most high-performance gliders are equipped from the factory with winglets, or some other wingtip device. Maughmer has consulted with German sailplane designers on winglets, non-planar wing tips, and other aerodynamic improvements incorporated in several production sailplanes.

== Education and academics ==
He received his Ph.D. (Aeronautical and Astronautical Engineering) from the University of Illinois in 1983, M.S. from Princeton University in 1975 and B.S. from the University of Illinois in 1972. Maughmer received the PSES Outstanding Teaching Award in 1993, the PSES Premier Teaching Award in 2001, and the Alumni Faculty Teaching Fellow Award in 2012. In 2009, Maughmer received the ASEE Fred Merryfield Design Award, a national award for teaching excellence in engineering design. He is active in the AIAA and has served on the Aircraft Design Technical Committee (1987–90). He received the AIAA/ASEE John Leland Atwood Award in 2013, and the AIAA William T. Piper Award in 2014. For the Soaring Society of America, he is chair of configuration and design for the Technical Board, serves on the board of directors for the Collegiate Soaring Association, and received the society's Exceptional Service Award in 1991. He has served on the Board of the International Organization for the Science and Technology of Soaring (OSTIV), and is currently the vice-president of that organization. He is also a glider pilot and a flight instructor with the Penn State Soaring Club.

== Selected publications ==
- Kody, F., Corle, E., Maughmer, M., and S. Schmitz. 2016. Higher-Harmonic Deployment of Trailing-Edge Flaps for Rotor-Performance Enhancement and Vibration Reduction. Journal of Aircraft Vol. 53(2) pp. 333–342.
- Coder, J. G. and M. D. Maughmer. 2014. CFD Compatible Transition Modeling Using an Amplification Factor Transport Equation. AIAA Journal Vol. 52(11) pp. 2506–2512.
- Coder, J.G., Maughmer, M.D., and D. M. Somers, D.M. 2014. Theoretical and Experimental Results for the S414, Slotted, Natural-Laminar-Flow Airfoil. Journal of Aircraft Vol. 51(6) pp. 1883–1890.
- Cole, J.A., Vieira, B.A.O., Coder, J.G., Premi, A., and M.D. Maughmer. 2013. An Experimental Investigation into the Effects of Gurney Flaps on Various Airfoils. Journal of Aircraft Vol. 50(4) pp. 1287–1294.
- Bramesfeld, G. and M. D. Maughmer. 2008. A Free-Wake, Lifting-Surface Model Using Distributed Vorticity Elements. Journal of Aircraft Vol. 45(2) pp. 560–568.
- Maughmer, M., Lesieutre, G., and M.P. Kinzel. 2007. Miniature Trailing-Edge Effectors for Rotorcraft Performance Enhancement. Journal of the American Helicopter Society Vol. 52(2) pp. 146–158.
- Bramesfeld, G., Maughmer, M.D., and S. M. Willits. 2006. Piloting Strategies for Controlling a Transport Aircraft after Vertical-Tail Loss. Journal of Aircraft Vol. 43(1) pp. 216–225.
- M.D. Maughmer. 2003. The Design of Winglets for High-Performance Sailplanes. Journal of Aircraft Vol. 40(6) pp. 1099–1106.
- Maughmer, M.D., Swan, T.J., and S. M.Willits. 2002. The Design and Testing of a Winglet Airfoil for Low-Speed Aircraft. Journal of Aircraft Vol. 39(4) pp. 654–661.
- Selig, M.S., Maughmer, M.D., and D. M. Somers. 1995. A Natural Laminar Flow Airfoil for General Aviation Applications. Journal of Aircraft Vol. 32(4) pp. 710–715.
- Dini, P. and M. D. Maughmer. 1994. A Locally Interactive Laminar Separation Bubble Model. Journal of Aircraft Vol. 31(4) pp. 802–810.
- Maughmer, M., L. Ozoroski, D. Straussfogel, and L. Long. 1993. Validation of Engineering Methods for Predicting Hypersonic Vehicle Controls Forces and Moments. Journal of Guidance, Control and Dynamics Vol. 16(4) pp. 762–769.
- Selig, M. S., and M. D. Maughmer. 1992. Generalized Multi-Point Inverse Airfoil Design. AIAA Journal, Vol. 30(11) pp. 2618–2615.
- Dini, P., M. S. Selig, and M. D. Maughmer. 1992. A Simplified Transition Prediction Method for Separated Boundary Layers. AIAA Journal Vol. 30(8) pp. 1953–1961.
- Maughmer, M. D., and D. M. Somers. 1989. Design and Experimental Results for a High-Altitude, Long-Endurance Airfoil. Journal of Aircraft Vol. 26(2) pp. 148–153.
- Ormsbee, A.I. and M. D. Maughmer. 1986. A Class of Airfoils Having Finite Trailing Edge Pressure Gradients. Journal of Aircraft Vol. 23(2) pp. 97–103.
- Ormsbee, A.I., Bragg, M.B., Maughmer, M.D., and F.L. Jordan. 1981. Scaling Wake-Particle Interactions for Aerial Applications Research. Journal of Aircraft Vol. 18(7) pp. 592–596.
