= Peter Masak =

Canadian-American engineer, inventor, and glider pilot

Peter C. Masak
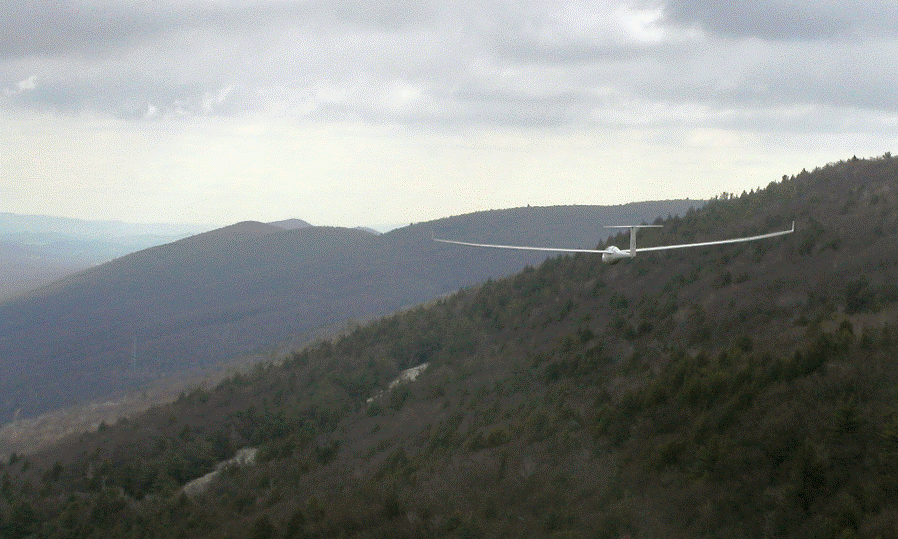
- Peter Masak ridge soaring his Masak Scimitar glider on Bald Eagle Mountain near Lock Haven, Pennsylvania
- Born: August 17, 1957; Canada
- Died: May 22, 2004 (aged 46); Alexandria, Pennsylvania
- Education: University of Waterloo
- Known for: Glider Winglets
- Awards: U.S. 15 Meter national gliding champion (1993); Soaring Society of America Exceptional Achievement Award (1995); Design News magazine Unique Airplane design contest winner (1995)
- Scientific career
- Fields: Mechanical Engineering and Aerodynamics

Peter C. Masak (August 17, 1957 – May 22, 2004) was an engineer, inventor, and glider pilot. He graduated with a Bachelor of Applied Science degree in mechanical engineering in May 1981 from the University of Waterloo, Ontario, Canada. He earned his glider pilot license at the age of 16 and his power pilot license at the age of 18, the minimum ages for both. Peter was a Canadian soaring record holder and represented Canada and later the United States in the World Gliding Championships. He logged almost 2000 hours of glider flight time. He was living in West Chester, Pennsylvania, with his wife Adrienne and their three children when he died.

== Winglets ==
In 1987, Peter Masak worked together with Mark D. Maughmer, an associate professor of aerospace engineering at the Pennsylvania State University, to design winglets for his racing sailplane to improve performance. Others had attempted to apply Richard T. Whitcomb's NASA winglets to gliders before, and they did improve climb performance, but this did not offset the parasite drag penalty in high speed cruise. Masak was convinced it was possible to overcome this hurdle.

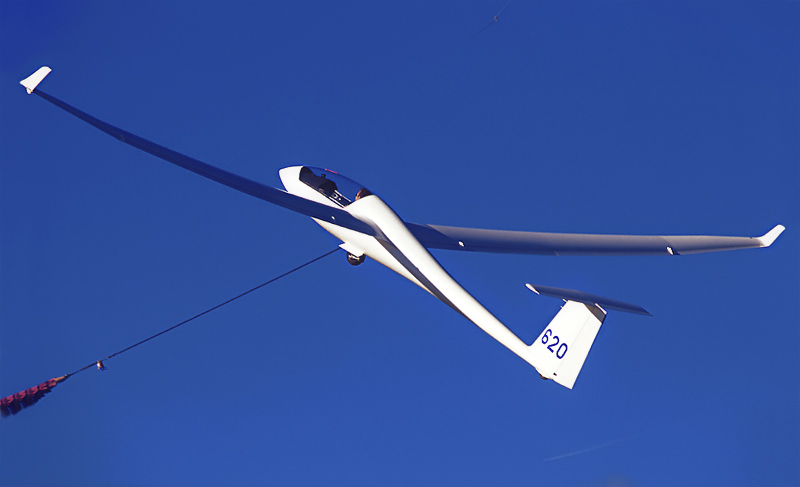
Schempp-Hirth Ventus 2a glider with factory winglets based on Masak's designs

By trial and error, they developed successful winglet designs for gliding competitions. At the 1991 World Gliding Championships in Uvalde, Texas, the trophy for the highest speed went to a glider with Masak's winglets. Masak went on to win the 1993 U.S. 15 Meter Nationals gliding competition using winglets on his prototype Scimitar sailplane.

The Masak winglets were originally retrofit to production sailplanes, but within 10 years of their introduction, most high-performance gliders were equipped from the factory with winglets. It took over a decade for winglets to first appear on a production airliner, the original application that was the focus of the NASA development in the 1970s. Yet, once the advantages of winglets were proven in competition, adoption was swift with gliders. The point difference between the winner and the runner-up in soaring competition is often less than one percent, so even a small improvement in efficiency is a large competitive advantage.

Many non-competition pilots installed Masak's winglets for the handling benefits as well. The benefits are notable, because sailplane winglets must be removable to allow the glider to be stored in a trailer, so they are usually installed only at the pilots' preference. Today, following on the work of Masak and Maughmer, new glider wings are designed concurrently with the winglet, achieving higher efficiency than retrofitted winglets, with drag less than the theoretical minimum for a fully elliptical wing of the same span.

== Scimitar sailplane ==
Peter Masak was the designer and builder of the Scimitar sailplane prototype, based on the Schempp-Hirth Ventus. It employed many of his design modifications, including a completely new wing and tailplane. The composite wing used a flexible S-glass torsion box spar, with stiff kevlar skins. "We get superior twist characteristics as a function of speed," Masak claimed. And the soft bending "reduces the local angle of attack during gusts to better keep the airfoil in the laminar-flow range." The wing chord was optimized continuously along the entire span, dispensing with typical straight-tapered sections. It won the Design News magazine Unique Airplane design contest in 1995.

The Scimitar featured an acoustic boundary layer flow control system to prevent laminar boundary layer flow separation, using a smaller, more highly cambered airfoil with a greater lift coefficient. "It's always good to have laminar flow," says Masak, "but you'd rather have turbulent attached flow than laminar separation."

He flew a later version of this glider, with factory built Ventus 2 wings, in the 2004 U.S. 15 Meter Nationals gliding competition being held at Mifflin County Airport, the same contest he won 11 years earlier. While flying a competition task, he crashed in a syncline fold in the Tussey Mountain ridge, a few miles south of the village of Alexandria, Pennsylvania at 40°29.94′N 78°08.49′W. He was attempting to cross the ridge line upwind, and encountered sinking air and turbulence in the lee of the mountain crest, resulting in an inadvertent stall/spin. The crash was not survivable, and he was killed on impact.

In his glider, he installed an Emergency Locator Transmitter (ELT), although it was not required. The wreckage was found in less than 24 hours, even though it was in steep terrain in a remote forested water-shed area, not visible from the air. As a result of this accident, and the subsequent search and rescue, ELT's are now required in many gliding competitions.

== Soaring accomplishments ==
- He earned FAI 1000 km diploma number 82 on April 30, 1987, by flying 1006.99 km in a Schleicher ASW 20A from Ridge Soaring Gliderport.
- The Soaring Society of America awarded him the Exceptional Achievement Award in 1995.

== Publications ==
In 1991, he produced a booklet titled Performance Enhancement of Modern Sailplanes which described not just the theory, but the art of performance modifications, including winglets. In it, he credited Dick Johnson, Wil Schuemann, George B. Moffat, Jr. and Richard Schreder for their pioneering work that inspired him.

== Patents ==
Peter Masak was a prolific inventor, and he appears as inventor on 17 U.S. Patents, mostly in the area of mechanical engineering applied in the petroleum industry.

- U.S. patent 7,063,141 – Apparatus for agitated fluid discharge
- U.S. patent 7,025,143 – Method for removing a deposit using pulsed fluid flow
- U.S. patent 6,956,372 – System and method for NMR logging with helical polarization
- U.S. patent 6,825,659 – Method and apparatus for nuclear magnetic resonance measuring while drilling
- U.S. patent 6,803,761 – Temperature compensated magnetic circuit
- U.S. patent 6,737,864 – Magnetic resonance fluid analysis apparatus and method
- U.S. patent 6,675,914 – Pressure reading tool
- U.S. patent 6,583,621 – Method and apparatus for nuclear magnetic resonance measuring while drilling
- U.S. patent 6,577,125 – Temperature compensated magnetic field apparatus for NMR measurements
- U.S. patent 6,362,619 – Method and apparatus for nuclear magnetic resonance measuring while drilling
- U.S. patent 6,268,726 – Method and apparatus for nuclear magnetic resonance measuring while drilling
- U.S. patent 6,094,401 – Inverse vertical seismic profiling using a measurement while drilling tool as a seismic source
- U.S. patent 5,901,113 – Inverse vertical seismic profiling using a measurement while drilling tool as a seismic source
- U.S. patent 5,517,464 – Integrated modulator and turbine-generator for a measurement while drilling tool
- U.S. patent 5,146,433 – Mud pump noise cancellation system and method
- U.S. patent 5,089,989 – Method and apparatus for measuring the quality of a cement to a casing bond
- U.S. patent 4,520,683 – Pump jack slant wells

== See also ==
- List of University of Waterloo people
