= Scimitar propeller =

Type of aircraft propeller

Swept propeller

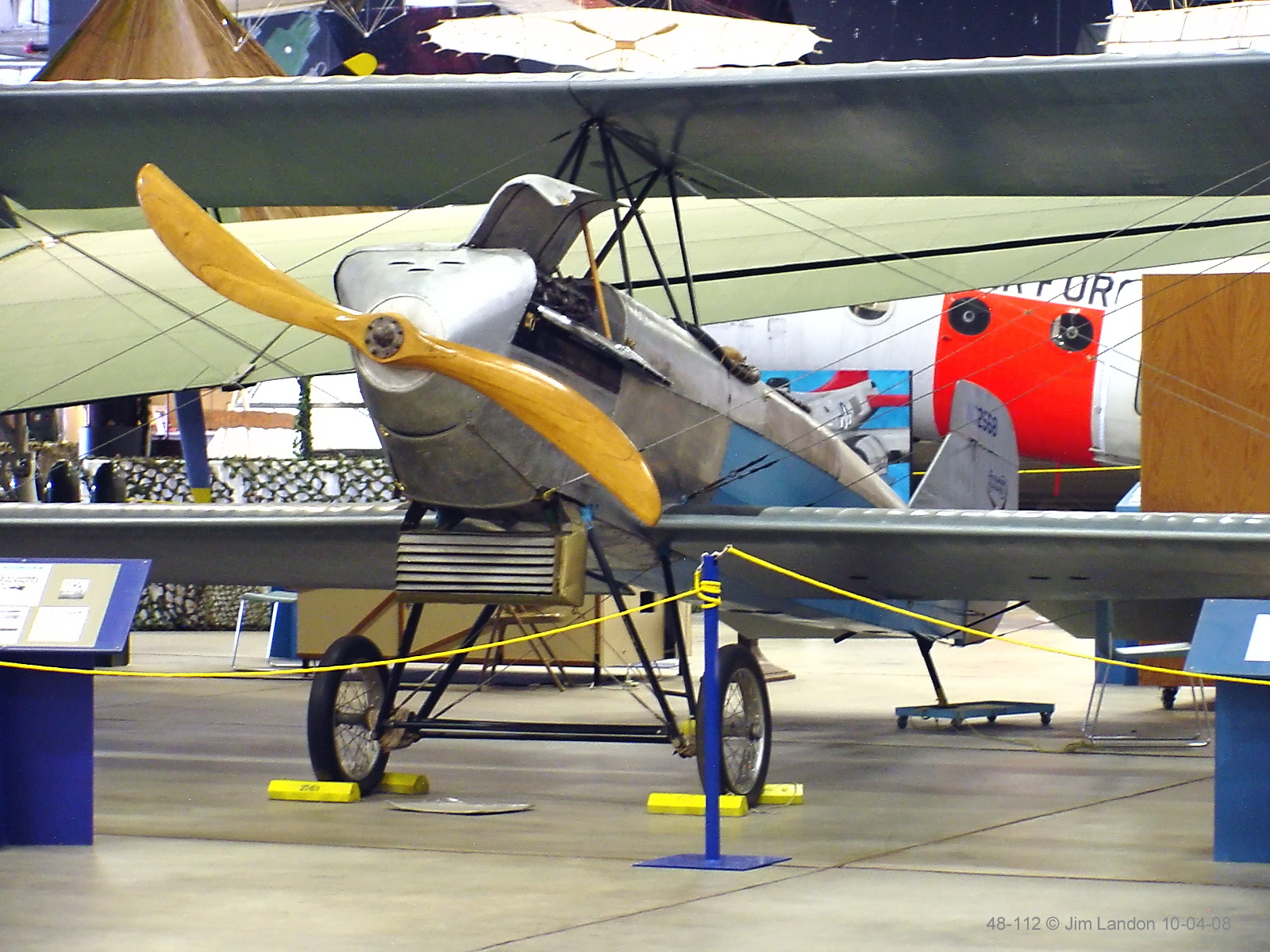
Scimitar propeller on a 1926 Alexander Eaglerock

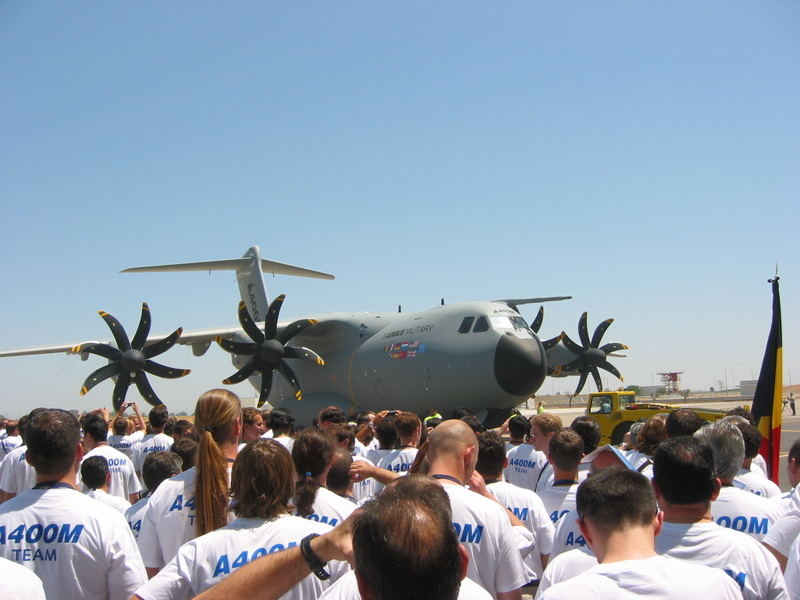
Eight-blade scimitar propellers on the Airbus A400M Atlas

A scimitar propeller is a type of propeller that has curved blades with increasing sweep along the leading edge. Their name is derived from their visual similarity to the curved blades of scimitars. In the early 1900s, as established by the French aeronautical inventor Lucien Chauvière and his commercial success with his scimitar-shaped Integrale propeller design, they were made of laminated wood. The combination of light weight and efficient aerodynamics results in more power and reduced noise.

All propellers lose efficiency at high rotational speeds due to an effect known as wave drag, which occurs as an airfoil approaches supersonic speeds. This powerful form of drag reduces propeller efficiency at high rotational speed which, in turn, reduces power transmission from the aircraft's engine. In the case of a propeller, this effect can happen when the propeller turns fast enough that the tips of the blades approach the speed of sound, even if the plane itself is not moving forward. Wave drag also occurs at high linear aircraft speeds. According to the same principles that govern swept wings in high-speed aircraft, propeller blades can be swept back in order to mitigate wave drag, thus allowing them to remain efficient at higher rotational speeds. Since the inboard part of a propeller has a slower rotational velocity relative to the tip, the blade becomes progressively more swept from the propeller hub to the tip, giving rise to its characteristic shape.

In the 1940s, NACA started researching swept propellers for use in high-speed propeller-driven aircraft. Modern usage of scimitar propellers centers around turboprop and propfan engines. Since these forms of propulsion are capable of driving a propeller at transsonic or supersonic rotational speeds, as well as propelling aircraft to similarly high speeds, mitigation of wave drag is an important consideration in achieving high aerodynamic efficiency. Like modern straight-bladed propellers, scimitar propellers often make use of lightweight materials to further increase efficiency.

Propfan engines were intended to deliver significant improvements in fuel economy compared to contemporary turbofan engines, and in this they succeeded. In static and air tests on a modified DC-9, propfans reached a 30% improvement. This efficiency comes at a price, as one of the major problems with the propfan is noise, particularly in an era where aircraft are required to comply with increasingly strict EASA and FAA noise requirements for certification. Propfans often feature scimitar blades as they typically operate at high rotational speeds.
