= Masak Scimitar =

American glider

Scimitar
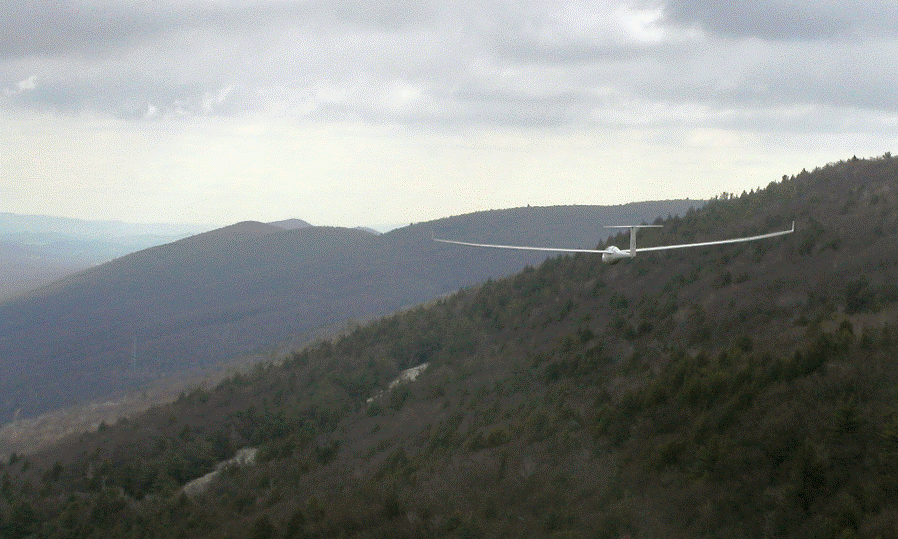
- Peter Masak ridge soaring the Scimitar on Bald Eagle Mountain near Lock Haven, Pennsylvania

General information
- Type: Glider
- National origin: United States
- Designer: Peter Masak
- Status: Sole example destroyed on 22 May 2004
- Primary user: Peter Masak
- Number built: one

History
- First flight: 1995
- Developed from: Schempp-Hirth Ventus

The Masak Scimitar was an American mid-wing, single-seat glider that was designed and constructed by Peter Masak. It first flew in 1995.

The aircraft was destroyed and the designer killed in a soaring accident on 22 May 2004.

== Design and development ==
The Scimitar was intended to use new aerodynamic technology to achieve higher performance in a competition sailplane. The aircraft mated a Schempp-Hirth Ventus fuselage with a wing of the same planform as the Schempp-Hirth Discus, outfitted with an electronic boundary layer control system.

The aircraft was made from carbon-fiber-reinforced polymer and fiberglass with Kevlar wing skins. Its 15 m (49.2 ft) span wing initially employed a Wortmann FX 79-K-144 airfoil.

The sole example was registered with the US Federal Aviation Administration in the Experimental - Amateur-built category.

== Operational history ==
The aircraft was involved in a minor accident on 25 April 1998 when trying to land after hitting sinking air while ridge soaring near Scrabble, West Virginia. While landing in a short 450 ft (137 m) length field the pilot ground looped the aircraft to avoid hitting a tree.

The Scimitar was destroyed on 22 May 2004 while flying in the US Nationals near Alexandria, Pennsylvania. Masak was attempting to cross a ridge line and struck a tree, resulting in his death. The US National Transportation Safety Board determined the cause of the accident to be "The pilot's failure to maintain airspeed, which resulted in an inadvertent stall/spin. A factor was the turbulent wind conditions." A "nationally known, locally based glider instructor" who assisted the accident investigation stated that if Masak had successfully crossed the ridgeline, "he would have been the only pilot to do so, and probably would have easily won the day," referring to the competition on that day."

== Variants ==
Scimitar I
Original configuration for the FAI 15-Metre Class, with a wing employing a Wortmann FX 79-K-144 airfoil
Scimitar II
Later configuration for the FAI Standard Class, with a wing employing a PM-24 airfoil

== Specifications (Scimitar) ==
Data from Sailplane Directory

General characteristics

- Crew: one
- Wingspan: 49 ft 3 in (15 m)
- Wing area: 113 sq ft (10.5 m^{2})
- Aspect ratio: 21.4
- Airfoil: Wortmann FX 79-K-144
- Empty weight: 600 lb (272 kg)
- Gross weight: 1,125 lb (510 kg) including 250 lb (113 kg) of water ballast

Performance

- Maximum glide ratio: 43:1 at 69 mph (111 km/h)
- Wing loading: 9.96 lb/sq ft (48.6 kg/m^{2})

== See also ==
Related lists

- List of gliders
