= Richard T. Whitcomb =

American aeronautical engineer (1921–2009)

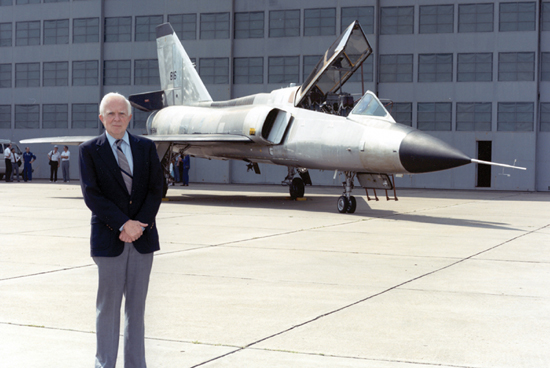
- Whitcomb in front of the area-ruled Convair F-106 used by NASA for flight research, on its retirement in 1991
- Born: February 21, 1921; Evanston, Illinois
- Died: October 13, 2009 (aged 88); Newport News, Virginia
- Education: Worcester Polytechnic; Institute (BS)
- Occupation: aeronautical engineer

Richard Travis Whitcomb (February 21, 1921 – October 13, 2009) was an American aeronautical engineer who was noted for his contributions to the science of aerodynamics.

== Biography ==
Whitcomb was born in Evanston, Illinois. His father, who had been a balloon pilot in World War I, was a mechanical engineer who specialized in rotational dynamics. In 1932 the family moved to Worcester, Massachusetts when his father became employed at the Norton company.

As a child Whitcomb was fascinated by airplanes; he built models and flew them in competitions, always striving to improve their performance. He graduated from Worcester Polytechnic Institute in 1943 with a BS in aeronautical engineering. He was employed at the Langley Research Center operated by the National Advisory Committee for Aeronautics (NACA) and its successor, NASA.

== Career ==
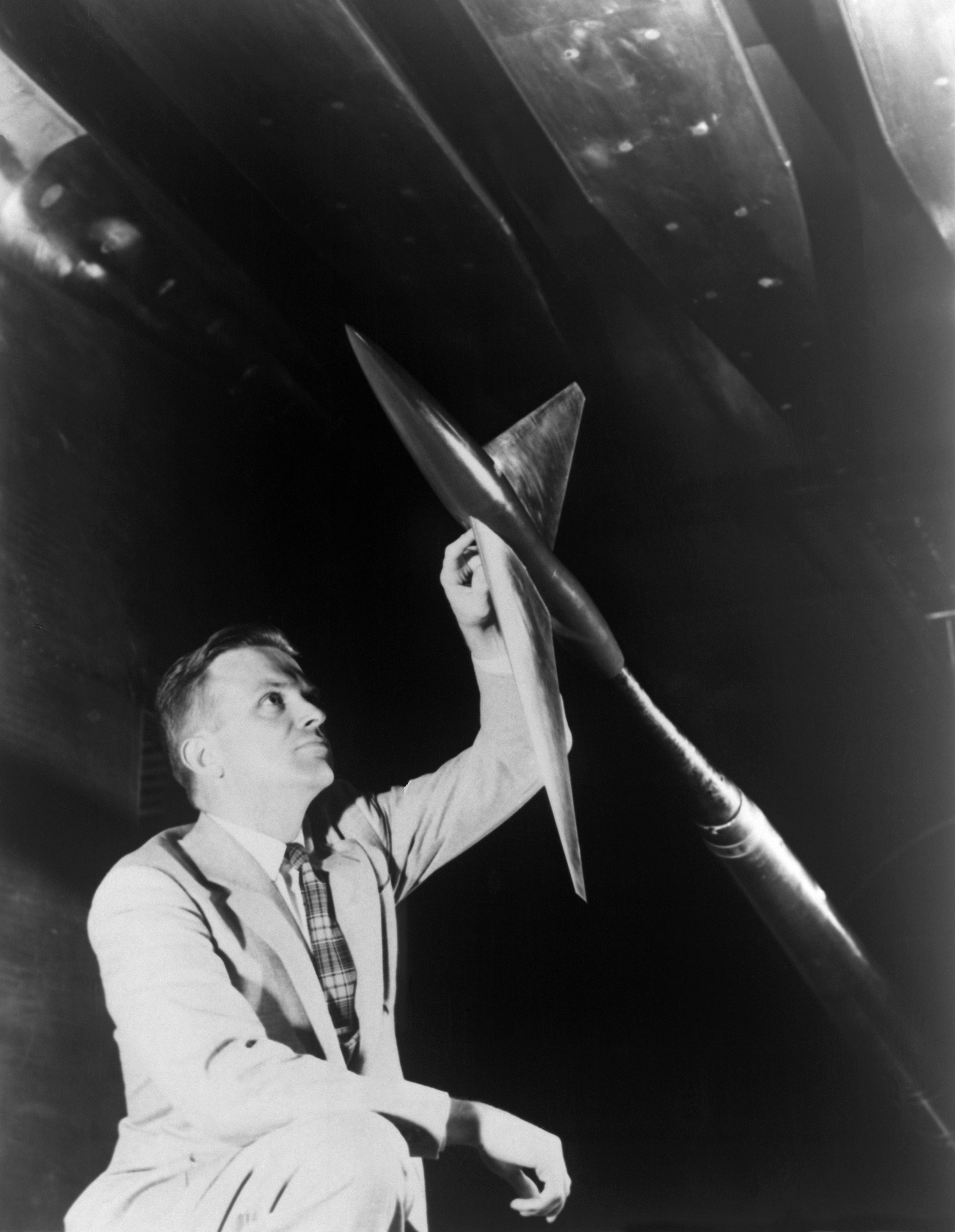
April 1955: Whitcomb examines a model aircraft designed in accordance with his area rule.

=== Area rule ===
After World War II, NACA research began to focus on near-sonic and low-supersonic airflow. After considering the sudden drag increase which a wing-fuselage combination experiences at somewhere around 500 mph (800 km/h), Whitcomb concluded that "the disturbances and shock waves are simply a function of the longitudinal variation of the cross-sectional area" – that is, the effect of the wings could be visualized as equivalent to a fuselage with a sort of midriff bulge whose frontal area was the same as that of the wings. Since the wings could not be dispensed with in the actual case, the alternate to removing the "bulge" would be to decrease the fuselage's cross-section near the wings. This became known as the area rule, which allowed a significant reduction in the drag felt by airplanes near the speed of sound. Its impact on aircraft design was immediate: the prototype Convair YF-102, for example, was found not to be capable of exceeding the speed of sound in level flight. This was rectified by re-sculpting the fuselage. For his insight, Whitcomb won the Collier Trophy in 1954.

In 1958 Whitcomb was named head of Langley's transonic aerodynamics branch, and he began working on a possible SST design. He built proposed models, but by 1962 he abandoned the project because of the intractable drag problem. Casting about for other research, he returned to the question of transonic drag, especially on wings.

=== Supercritical airfoil ===
To achieve reduced drag in the transonic phase, Whitcomb realized that the wing's pressure distribution must be modified to delay and weaken the shock wave created on the upper surface where the high-velocity flow decelerated to subsonic. Using intuition rather than mathematics, he built a two-foot (0.6-meter) chord wing section and tested it repeatedly in the Langley high-speed wind tunnel, adding (with auto body putty) or removing (with a file and sandpaper) material until the desired flows were achieved.

Although a low-drag airfoil (in the transonic range) was thus produced, Whitcomb's superiors observed that not every aircraft manufacturer could be expected to use file and sandpaper to design the needed shapes. Therefore, NASA signed a contract with the Courant Institute at New York University, whose mathematician Paul Garabedian and aerodynamicist Antony Jameson worked with Whitcomb to develop a practical computational method for designing supercritical airfoils - those that were most efficient in the transonic range. Using this method, supercritical wings were fabricated and proven on full-scale aircraft; in 1971 a Vought F-8 Crusader, and in 1973 a General Dynamics F-111 Aardvark, were flown at the NASA Flight Research Center in California. For his contribution, NASA awarded Whitcomb a $25,000 prize, and he received the 1974 Wright Brothers Memorial Trophy from the National Aeronautic Association.

The unusual airfoil unexpectedly aided general aviation as well: its rather blunt leading edge allowed it to generate high lift coefficients before stalling, and Whitcomb published a low-speed airfoil which he called GA(W)-1; it is now routinely used in light aircraft and gliders.

Following his research on wings, Whitcomb again turned to a possible complete supercritical aircraft, and in 1971 he published preliminary details of a near-sonic transport (NST), which he predicted could attain a relatively efficient cruise at 0.98 Mach. As with his supercritical wing efforts, he had largely developed the design in the wind tunnel, shaping his proposed model with putty and knife until the various secondary shocks created by wing-body intersections were muted as much as possible. Whitcomb's NST proposal was not advanced beyond his concept stage.

=== Winglets ===
Aerodynamicists had known for decades that some sort of wingtip barrier could reduce wingtip vortices, and thus the drag. However, Whitcomb was apparently the first to conclude that such a barrier would be most efficient if it took the form of a supplementary vertical (or near-vertical) wing. He proposed his results, showing improvements on the order of 5 percent, but industry was slow to adopt. It took nearly three decades for his proposals to become commonplace; they now are routinely used on aircraft from airliners to gliders.

== Later life ==
Following his groundbreaking research on transonic airflow, Whitcomb spent several years moving in an entirely different field - the possible extraction of usable energy from the environment by employing possible avenues of quantum physics. However, these investigations bore no result, and in 1980 he suddenly announced his decision to retire from Langley. Whitcomb continued to serve as a consultant to the aviation industry when asked. He continued to live in an apartment building in Hampton, Virginia, his residence since 1943. He had never married, but for 25 years was close to a NASA mathematician, Barbara Durling. She died in 2001. Whitcomb died in Newport News, Virginia in 2009.

== Awards and honors ==
- Collier Trophy of the National Aeronautic Association (1954)
- USAF Exceptional Service Medal (1955)
- NASA Distinguished Service Medal (1956)
- ASA Exceptional Scientific Service Medal (1959)
- National Medal of Science in engineering (1973)
- Wright Brothers Memorial Trophy of the National Aeronautic Association (1974)
- Member National Academy of Engineering (1976)
- Howard N. Potts Medal (1979)
- International Air & Space Hall of Fame inductee (1998).
- NAS Award in Aeronautical Engineering from the National Academy of Sciences. (2000)
- National Inventors Hall of Fame (2003)
- National Aviation Hall of Fame (2012)
