= Robinson R88 =

Turbine-powered helicopter

R88

General information
- Type: Light utility helicopter
- Manufacturer: Robinson Helicopter Company

History
- Predecessors: Robinson R66

The Robinson R88 is an under development helicopter designed and built by Robinson Helicopter Company. It has ten seats and is powered by a Safran Arriel 2W turboshaft engine. Unlike the R22, R44, and R66, which use a teetering bar control, the R88 uses conventional dual controls.

It was announced in March 2025, with first flight expected later in the year.

== Specifications ==
General characteristics

- Crew: 1
- Capacity: 8 passengers or 3,000 lb (1,360 kg) external load
- Powerplant: 1 × Safran Arriel 2W turboshaft, 1,000 shp (750 kW)
- Cruise speed: 130 kn (240 km/h)

Performance

- Range: 350 nmi (400 mi, 650 km)

== See also ==
Related development

- Robinson R22
- Robinson R44
- Robinson R66

Aircraft of comparable role, configuration, and era

- Airbus AS350 AStar
- Airbus H135
- Bell 429 GlobalRanger

Related lists

- List of most-produced rotorcraft
