= Robinson R66 =

Turbine-powered helicopter

R66
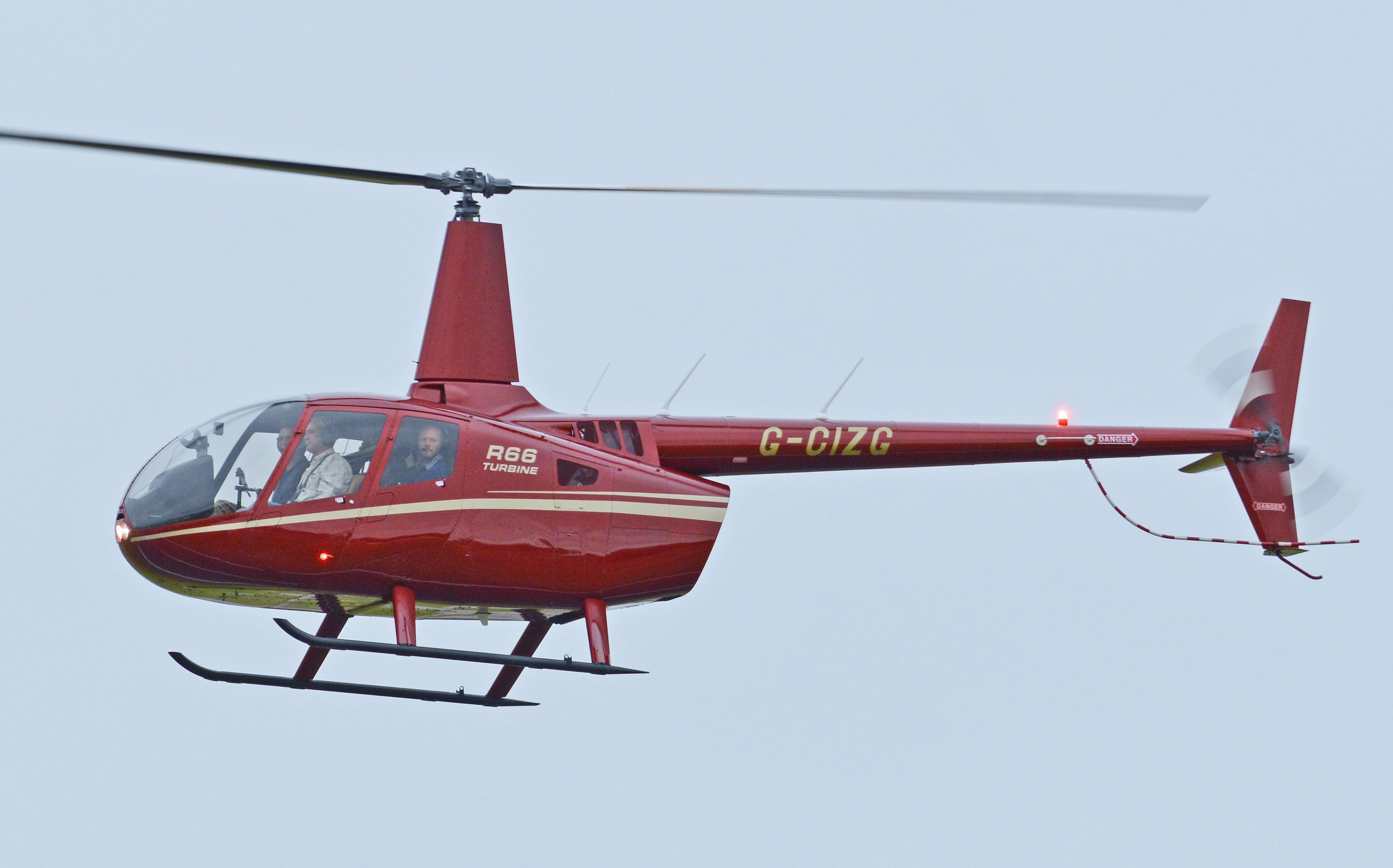

General information
- Type: Light utility and trainer helicopter
- Manufacturer: Robinson Helicopter Company
- Designer: Frank D. Robinson
- Status: In production, in service
- Number built: 1500 (2024)

History
- Manufactured: 2007–present
- Introduction date: 2010 (FAA certification)
- First flight: 7 November 2007
- Developed from: Robinson R44
- Developed into: Robinson R88

The Robinson R66 is a light helicopter designed and built by Robinson Helicopter Company. It has five seats, a separate cargo compartment and is powered by a Rolls-Royce RR300 turboshaft engine. The R66 is slightly faster and smoother than the piston-powered Robinson R44 from which it is derived. The R66 received both type and production certificates from the U.S. Federal Aviation Administration (FAA) on October 25, 2010.

== Development ==
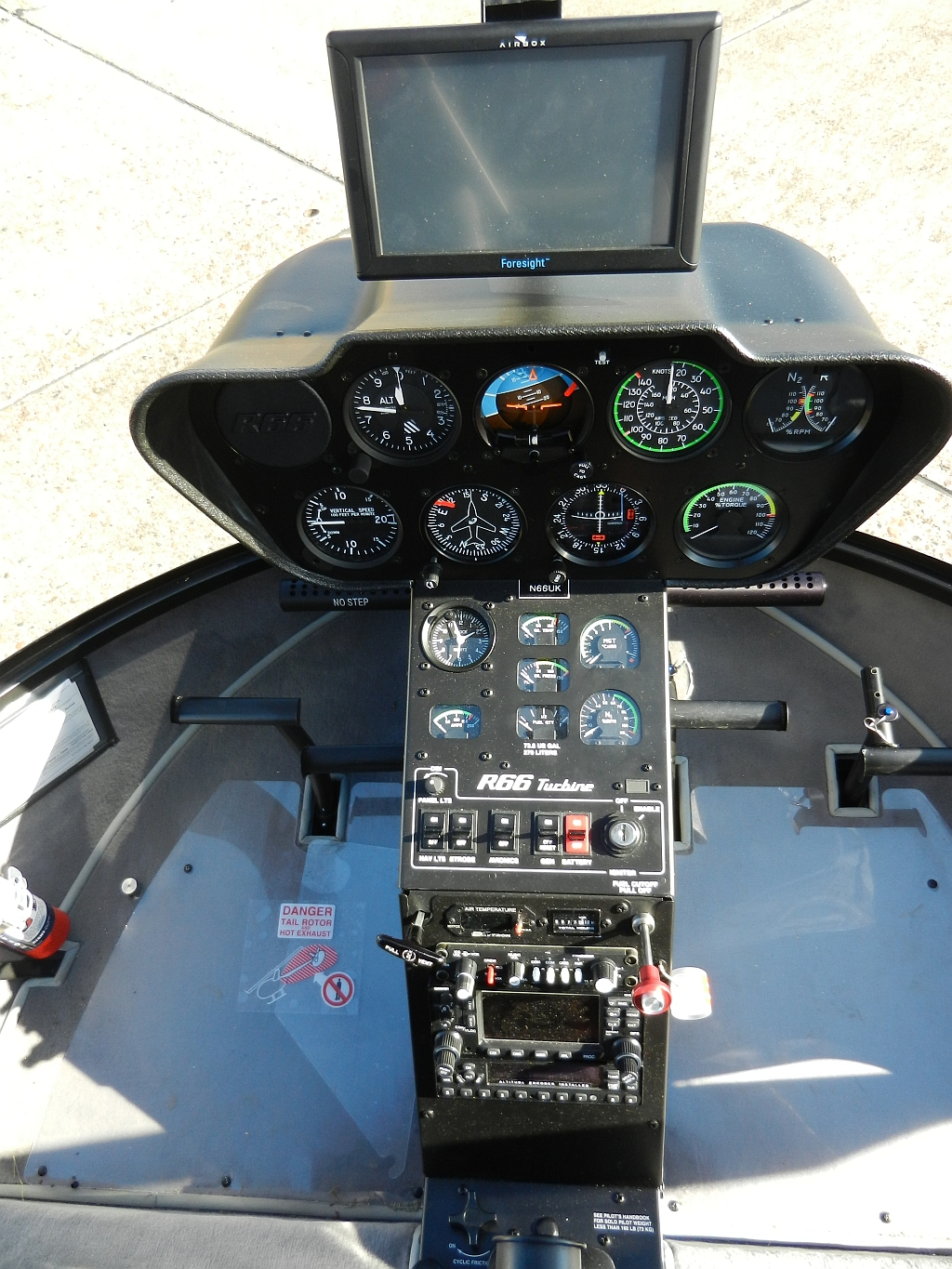
R66 Cockpit controls

Announced in 2007, the R66 was designed to be the company's first turbine-powered product and to extend its product range to compete with larger helicopters manufactured by Bell Helicopter and Eurocopter. Most of the R66 design is based on the earlier piston-engine R44.

Robinson began taking orders for the R66 in February, 2010, and went into preliminary production in the same year, followed by full production in 2011. A four-seat police version of the R66 has entered production with a forward looking infrared (FLIR) camera system, searchlight, and external public address (PA) system as standard equipment.

In 2012, Robinson delivered 191 R66s, while Robinson's competitors in the light single turbine sector delivered only 40 units between them. About 70 percent of the R66 production is exported. In 2014, the production rate slowed to about two R66s per week for a total of 101 for the year. In 2015, Robinson produced three R66s per week. Robinson entered into a contract with Rolls-Royce to supply 100 RR300 turbines per year for 10 years.

Russia certified the R66 in March 2013, while Canada certified it in June 2013. European EASA and Chinese CAAC certifications were granted in the second quarter of 2014.

The R66 Turbine Marine with pop-out floats was FAA certified in November 2014. A journalist pilot described ground landing with them as "better than the standard R66". Retrofit floats are not available for the standard R66.

A cargo hook was approved in the EU and the United States in 2015.

In December 2015 Robinson announced it had sold 700 R66s.

On July 13, 2017, Robinson announced certification of the R66 Turbine Newscopter (R66 ENG).

On 25 January 2017 Robinson announced that it had delivered its 12,000th aircraft, an R66 to a charter and tour operator, Fly Karoo Air Services.

On 17 July 2017, Robinson introduced the TB17 lithium-ion phosphate battery as optional equipment. The battery weighs 16 lb (7.3 kg), which is lighter than the previous 42 lb (19 kg) standard and 52 lb (24 kg) high capacity batteries.

The company delivered the 1,000th R66 in August 2020. As of early 2024, this had increased to 1500.

== Design ==
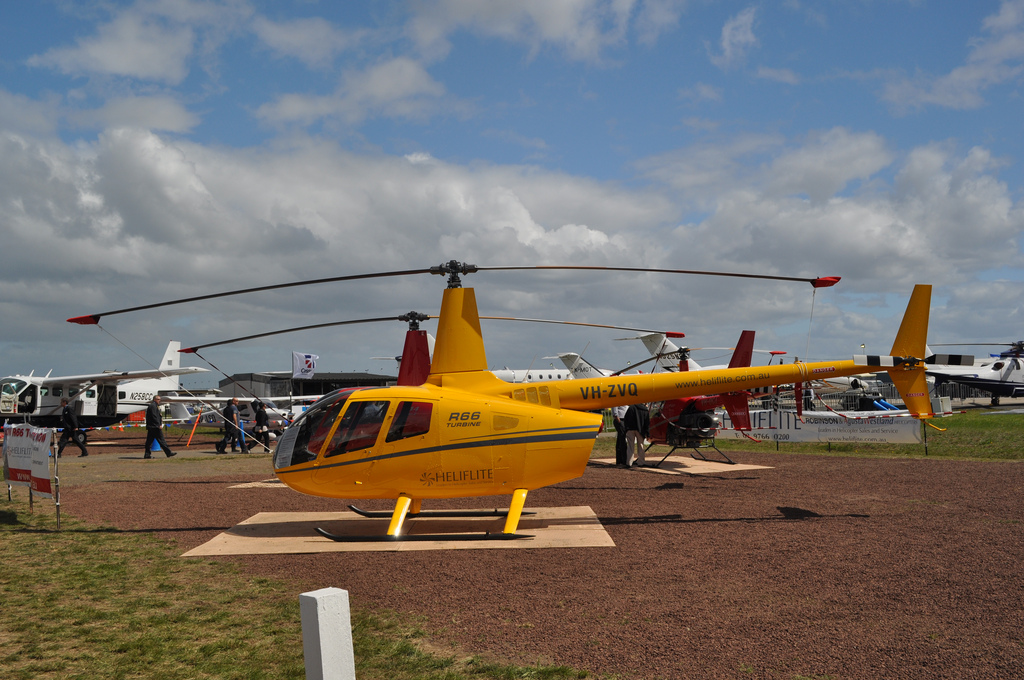
R66 Turbine production model

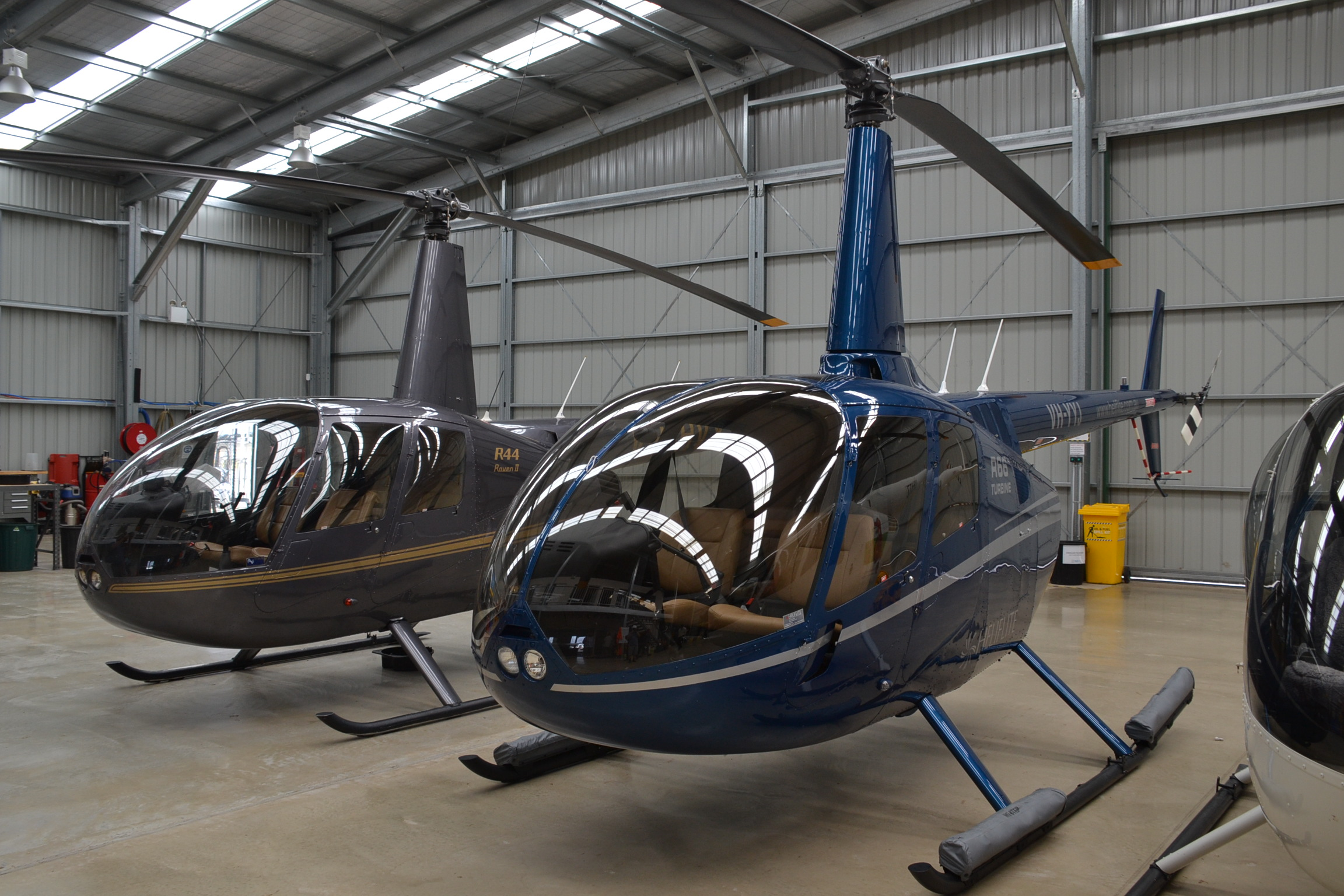
Robinson R44 (left) and R66 (right)

The R66 is a single-engined helicopter with two-bladed main and tail rotors, and a fixed skid landing gear. The R66 is constructed from advanced composites, aluminum alloy (sheet), and chromoly steel. Like the R44, the R66 has both electromechanical instruments and optional digital glass cockpit.

The R66 is the first Robinson helicopter with a cargo hold; the hold carries up to 300 pounds (140 kg).

The RR300 engine is more compact and lighter than the Lycoming O-540 six-cylinder piston engine that powers the R44—the R66 has a lower empty weight than the R44. The RR300 has a simplified single-stage centrifugal compressor which makes it less expensive and is expected to result in lower maintenance costs.

Depending on operational conditions, the turbine burns Jet-A fuel at a rate of 23 US gallons (87 L) per hour, compared to 15 US gallons (57 L) of avgas per hour for the O-540.

At Heli Expo 2018, Robinson introduced a cargo hook as an optional equipment. This modification increases the aircraft's maximum gross weight from 2,700 to 2,900 lb (1,200 to 1,300 kg). It is currently available in two variants.

Robinson redesigned the tail in the 2020s to utilize a symmetrical horizontal stabilizer to reduce the danger of mast bumping accidents, such as during low-G conditions maneuvers. This type of maneuver is more dangerous in a two bladed helicopter, and is warned against, however incidents have led to further investigation and improvements. The FAA approved the new empennage, to improve roll stability when the helicopter is in flight at high speed.

== Ground handling ==
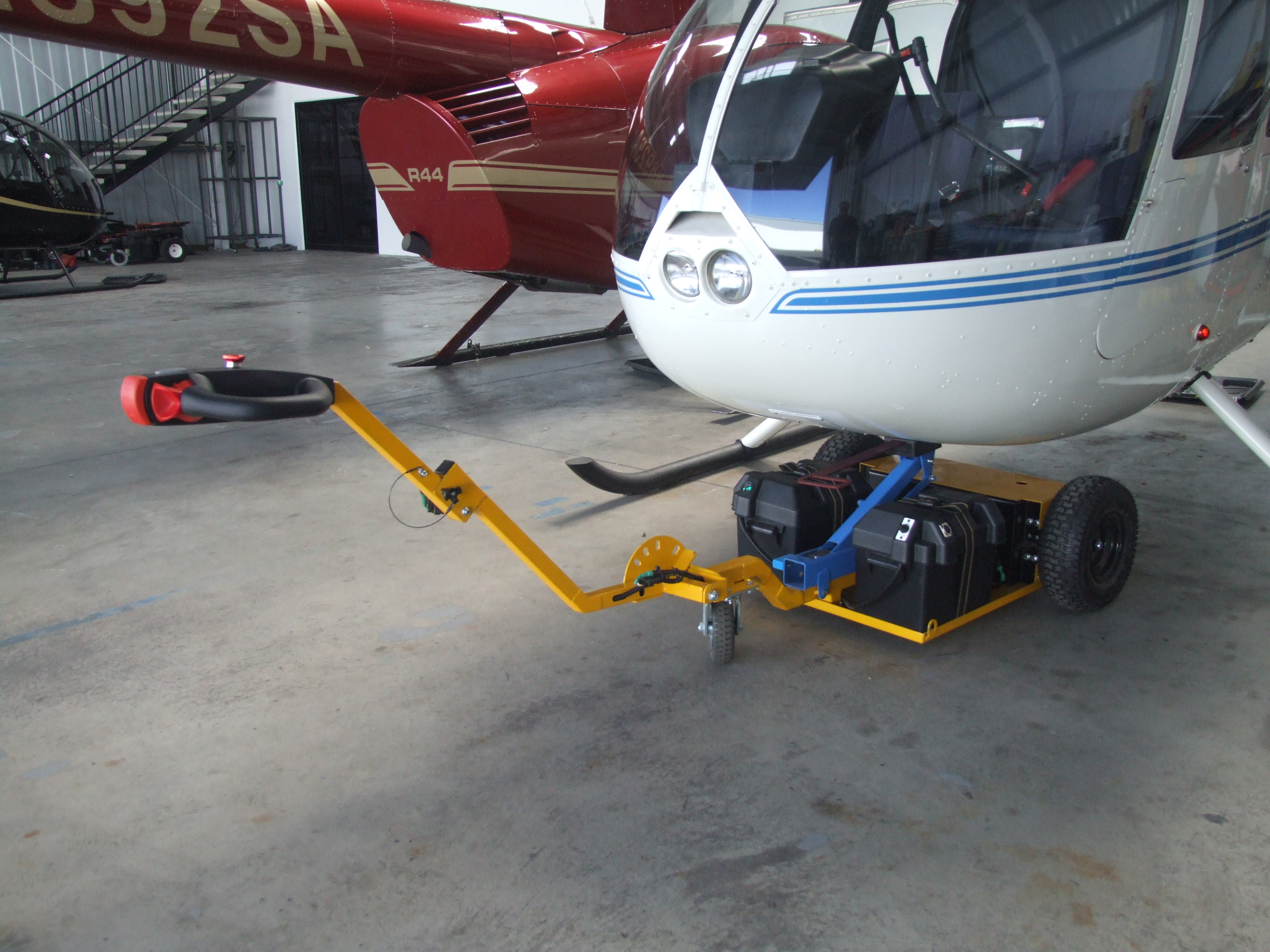
Robinson Helicopter Tow Cart Connected to R66

R66’s are equipped with wheel mounts toward the rear of the skids, one on each side, for attachment of removable wheels. The wheels must be removed prior to flight. These brackets are slightly behind the helicopter center of gravity so when the wheels are installed, the helicopter sits nose low. The wheel assembly has a pivot pin which is inserted into the skid-mounted bracket and then rotated over center to lift the rear of the skids about 2 inches leaving the front of the skids on the ground. The helicopter can be moved by pulling down on the tail to lift the front of the skids off the ground. Because of the size and weight of the R66 and the height of the tail from the ground, as compared to the R22, it is extremely difficult if not impossible for a single person to move the helicopter this way. Another person can help by pushing on the rear of the engine compartment.

R66’s with fixed floats or deployed pop-out emergency floats must have wheels installed under the skids as the bracket is not accessible.

All models and years of the R66 include a ¾” diameter tow ball mounted on the bottom of the fuselage, near the front and offset slightly to the left. A tow cart or tug can be engaged with the ball and then used to lift the front of the helicopter to clear the skids from the ground after the wheels are installed and rotated to lift the rear of the skids. This makes it possible for a single person to move the helicopter, even over significant distances or non-level surfaces.

Tow carts are available with a variety of features. There exist manual versions which place the ball mating device behind the wheels so the operator engages the ball then pushes down on the handle to lift the nose. Others provide a repurposed car-style hydraulic jack or an electric jack to lift the nose.

Tow carts are available with no motive power, a gas engine or one or two electric motors operated from one or two batteries. Some of the non-powered tow carts are set up to be towed such as behind a golf cart or quad cycle. One manufacturer offered a modified pallet jack.

The other option for ground handling is a landing platform which is large enough for the helicopter to safely land on, has wheels underneath and can be towed between the hangar and take-off location. These are heavy and must be towed with a vehicle. Platforms are commonly used with R66’s.

== Variants ==
TH-66 Sage
Military trainer variant of the R66 for the United States Army.

== Operators ==
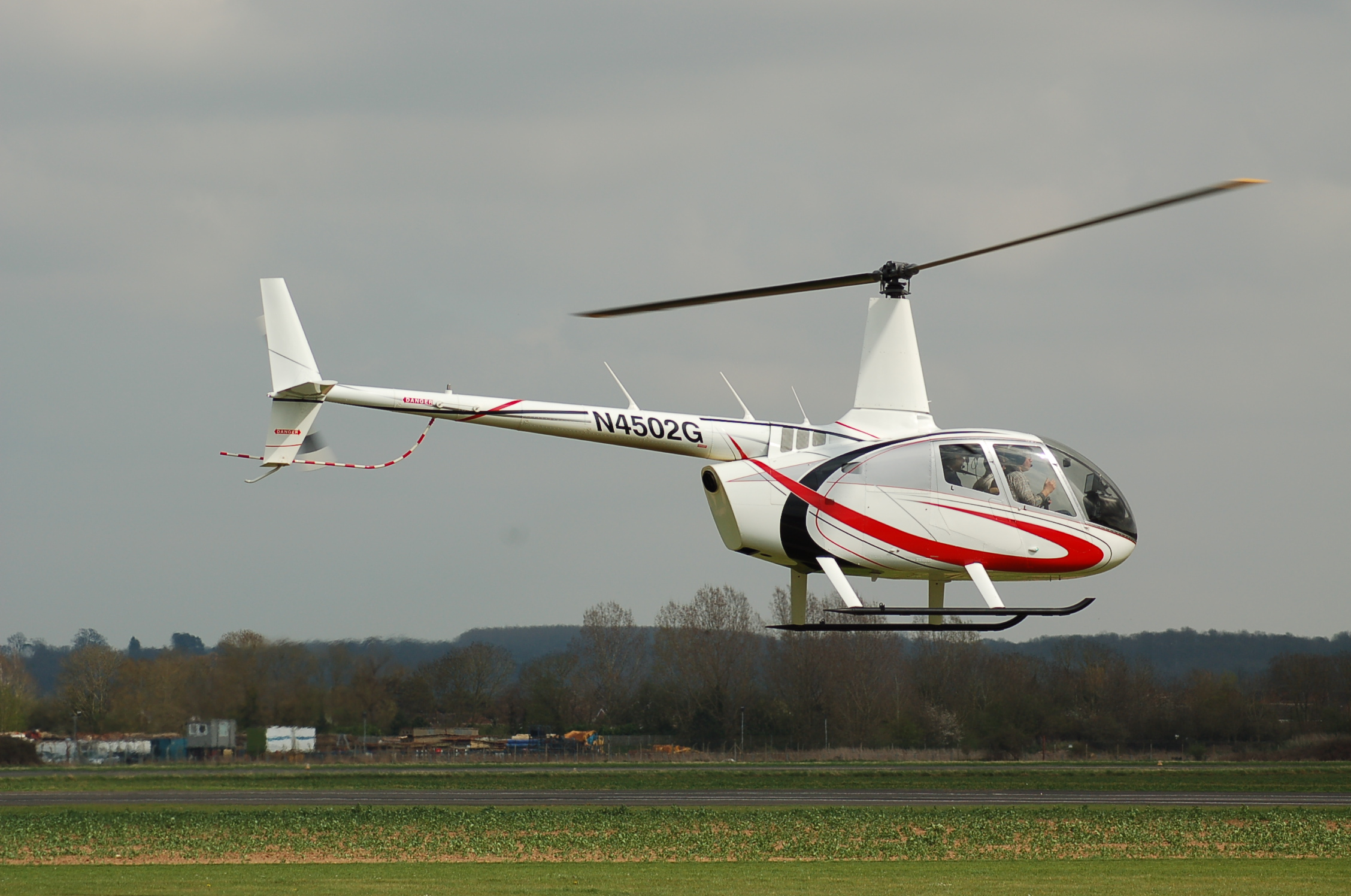
R66 in 2013 in the United Kingdom

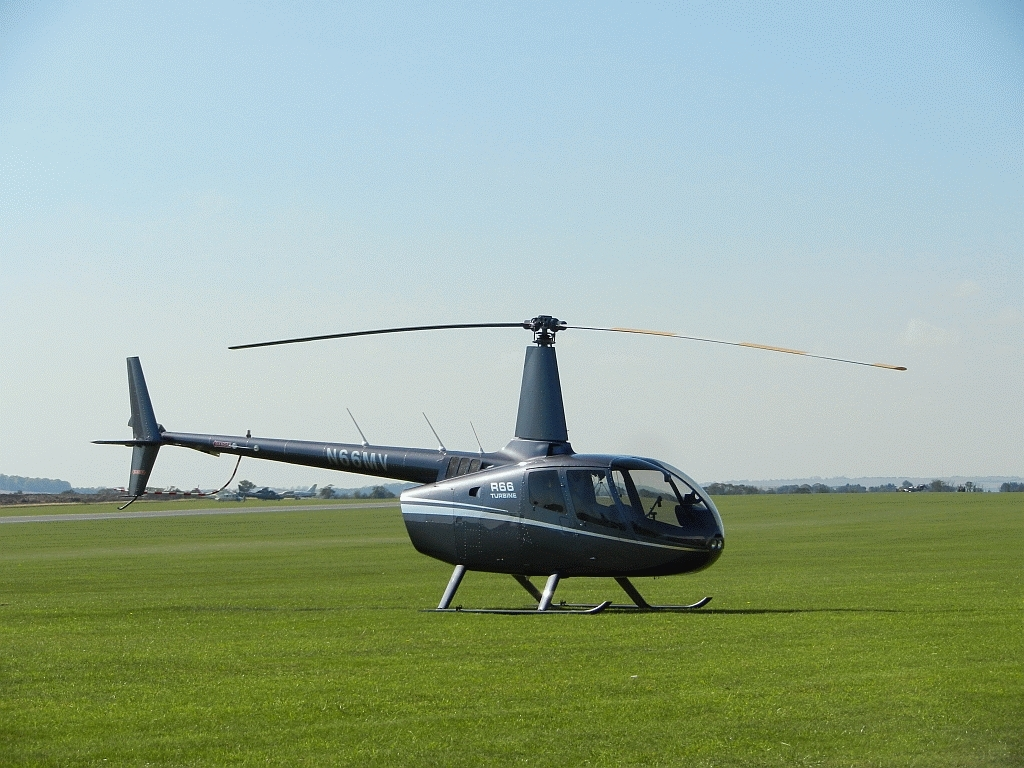
R66 parked in a field, 2011

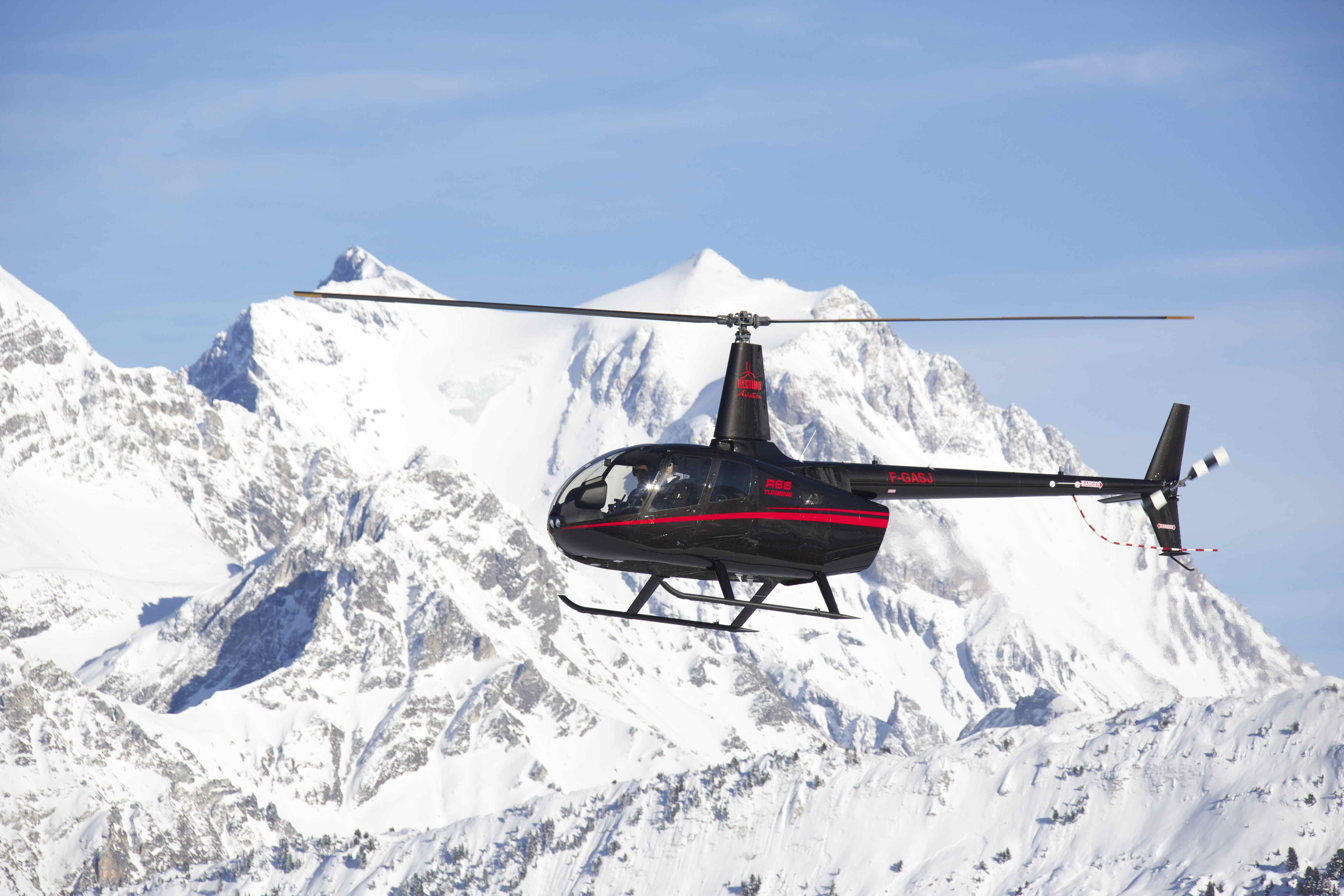
Robinson R66 flying in the French Alps, 2015

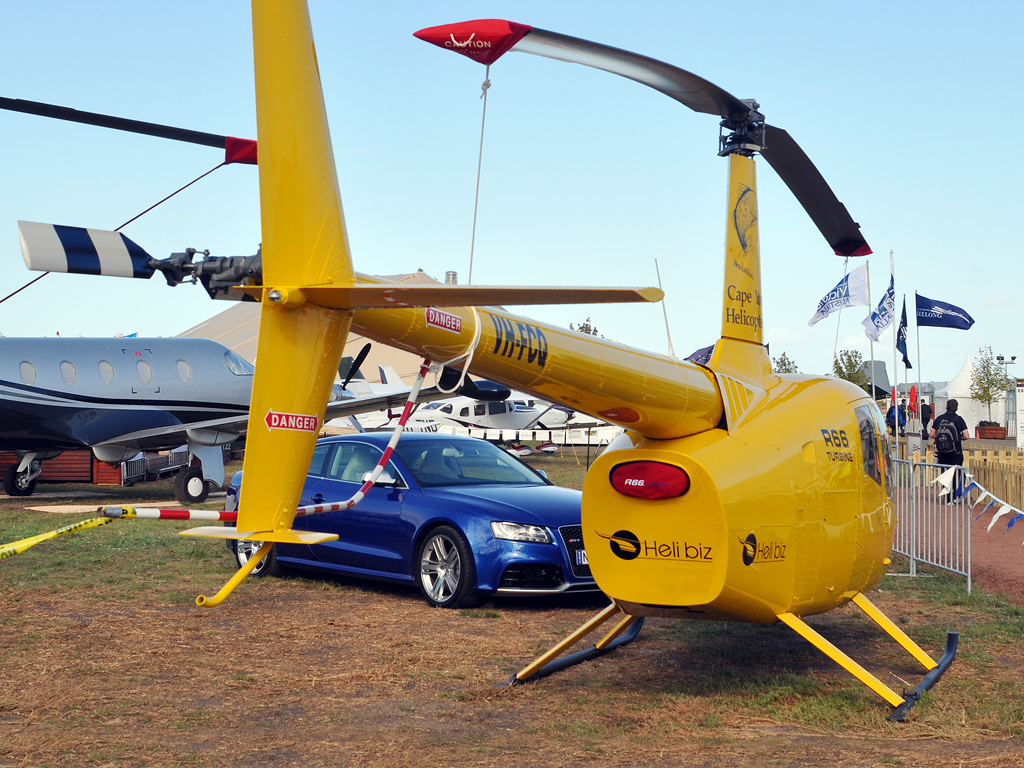
Tail view of an R66, 2011

The aircraft is operated by law enforcement, companies and private individuals.

Indonesia

- National Disaster Management Authority

Nigeria

- Nigerian Air Force

== Specifications ==
Data from Manufacturer

General characteristics

- Crew: 1
- Capacity: 4 passengers or 1,200 lb (540 kg) external load
- Length: 29 ft 6 in (8.99 m)
- Width: 4 ft 10 in (1.47 m)
- Height: 11 ft 5 in (3.48 m)
- Empty weight: 1,290 lb (585 kg)
- Gross weight: 2,700 lb (1,225 kg)
- Fuel capacity: 73.6 US gallons (279 L)
- Powerplant: 1 × Rolls-Royce RR300 turboshaft, 224 shp (167 kW) continuous, 270 shp (200 kW) takeoff (5 minutes)
- Main rotor diameter: 33 ft (10 m)
- Tail rotor Diameter: 5 ft (1.52 m)

Performance

- Cruise speed: 110 kn (130 mph, 200 km/h)
- Never exceed speed: 140 kn (160 mph, 260 km/h)
- Range: 350 nmi (400 mi, 650 km)
- Service ceiling: 14,000 ft (4,300 m)
- Rate of climb: 1,000 ft/min (5.1 m/s)
- Fuel consumption: 23 US gallons (87 L) per hour

== See also ==
Related development

- Robinson R22
- Robinson R44

Aircraft of comparable role, configuration, and era

- Bell 206
- Bell 505 Jet Ranger X
- Enstrom 480
- MD Helicopters MD 500
- Schweizer S333

Related lists

- List of most-produced rotorcraft
