= Robinson R22 =

American helicopter model

R22
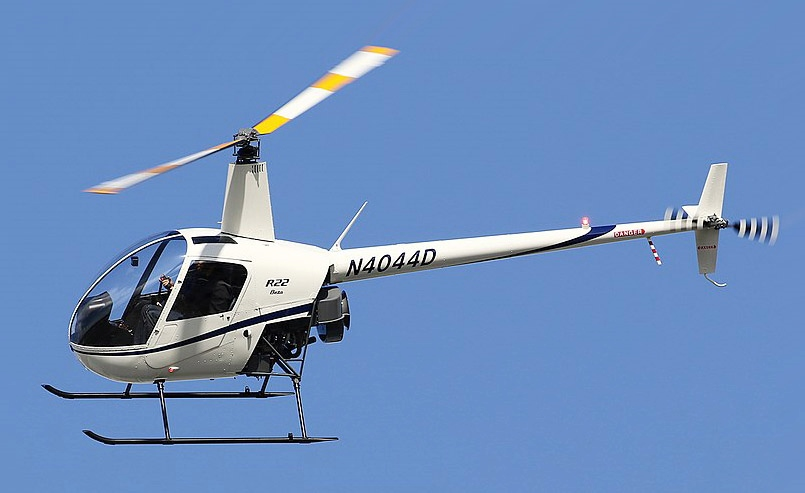

General information
- Type: Light utility and trainer helicopter
- Manufacturer: Robinson Helicopter Company
- Designer: Frank D. Robinson
- Status: In production
- Number built: over 4,800 (2019)

History
- Manufactured: 1979–present
- Introduction date: 1979
- First flight: 1975
- Developed into: Robinson R44

The Robinson R22 is a two-seat, two-bladed, single-engined, light utility helicopter manufactured by Robinson Helicopter Company. It was designed in 1973 by Frank D. Robinson, and has been in production since 1979.

== Development ==
The majority of flight testing was performed at Zamperini Field in Torrance, California. Flight testing and certification were performed in the late 1970s by test pilot Joseph John "Tym" Tymczyszyn, and the R22 received FAA certification in March 1979. Due to relatively low acquisition and operating costs, the R22 has been popular as a primary rotorcraft trainer around the world, entry-level personal helicopter, and as a livestock-management tool on large ranches in North America and cattle stations in Australia.

The R22 has a very low-inertia rotor system and the control inputs are operated directly by push rods with no hydraulic assistance. Thus, its flight controls are very sensitive and require a light touch to avoid overcorrection, and students who master an R22 are usually well prepared to transition to heavier helicopters. Due to the specific training required by the low-inertia rotor system and a teetering main rotor, operation of the Robinson R22 or R44 in the US requires a special endorsement by a certified flight instructor. SFAR 73 includes discussion and training on energy management, mast bumping, low rotor RPM (blade stall), low G hazards and rotor RPM decay. Tip weights were added to the R22 to increase rotor inertia, but the small rotor limits weight.

The first R22 sold, October, 1979, S/N 003, N1010WR, was purchased by Pacific Wing and Rotor, Inc., represented by Tim Tucker who later became a test pilot and chief instructor for Robinson. S/N 001 was crashed in the ocean during certification testing due to a failure of the casting that mates the tail rotor gearbox and stabilizing fins to the conical monocoque aluminum tail boom and S/N 002 was used to complete the FAA certification. S/N 002, N32AD, is still owned by Robinson and is now preserved in the collection of the Smithsonian Air and Space Museum.

By 2019, 4800 R22 had been made.

=== R22 cost ===
Initially, Robinson projected the sale price in 1977 to be US$18-19,000. However, 3 months prior to initial deliveries starting in 1979, the price was raised to US$33,850. Per Tim Tucker, the sale price for S/N 003 including options was US$48,000, ($212,930 in 2025).

As of 15 January 2024, the R22 Beta II has a suggested retail price of US$375,000 (ex-factory price, USA) and the value on the second-hand market is dependent on component time in service. The estimated operating cost of a R22 Beta II, per the factory, including insurance, reserve for overhaul, and direct operating cost (fuel, oil, inspections, unscheduled maintenance) is US$189.87/hr when flown 500 hours per year.

Depreciation on a Robinson R22 is negligible, as freshly overhauled R22s typically sell for more than the original cost. However, a provision per flown hour must be made for a "reserve for overhaul" cost, currently estimated at US$90.42 per hour.

=== Design ===
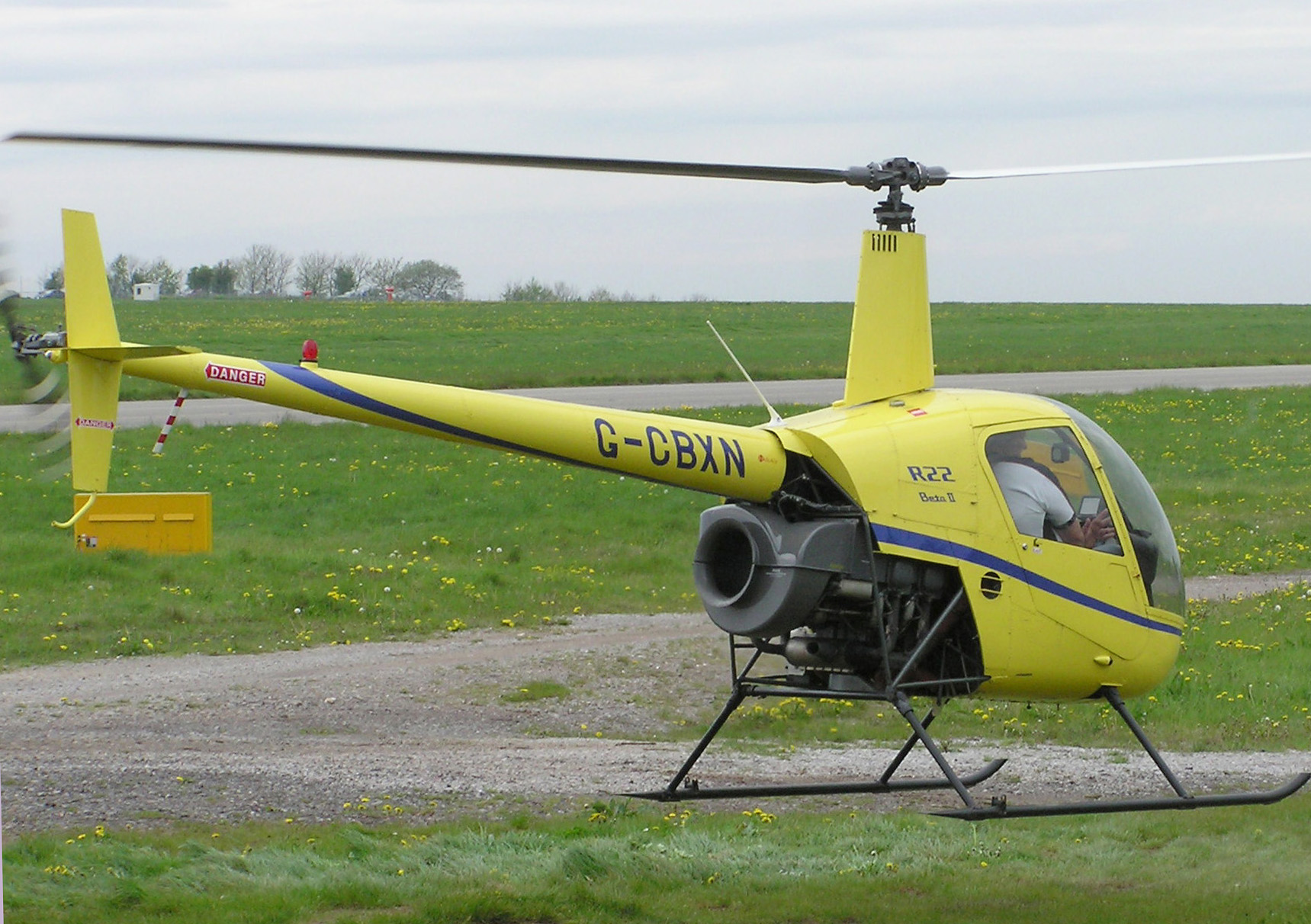
Robinson R22 hovering

The R22 is a light, two-place, single reciprocating-engined helicopter, with a semirigid, two-bladed main rotor and a two-bladed tail rotor. The main rotor has a teetering hinge and two coning hinges. The tail rotor has only a teetering hinge.

The normal production variant has skid landing gear. The Mariner version, no longer manufactured, provided floats. Wheeled gear is not available.

The basic structure is welded chromoly steel tubing. The forward fuselage is made of fiberglass and aluminum with a Plexiglas canopy. The tailcone and vertical and horizontal stabilizers are aluminum. It has an enclosed cabin with side-by-side seating for a pilot and passenger. The doors may be removed for flight, as is often done for photographic flights, interior cooling in high temperatures, or a 10.4 lb weight saving.

The first version was produced as the R22, followed by the R22 HP, R22 Alpha, R22 Beta, and R22 Beta II. Superficially, the aircraft appear similar. The R22 HP was fitted with a 160 bhp Lycoming O-320-B2C engine, an increase of 10 bhp (7.5 kW) over the original R22. The steel-tube frame on the R22 Alpha was modified by extending the aft landing-gear mounting points, giving it a slightly nose-down attitude on the ground and better matching of the skids to the ground in a low-altitude hover with two people on board. The R22 Beta added an engine speed governor (optional), rotor brake, and auxiliary fuel tank (optional). The battery was moved from below the instrument cluster to the engine compartment for better balance. The R22 has been offered as an instrument trainer version, with optional fixed floats as the R22 Mariner, and other special configurations for police work, electronic news gathering, and so on. The R22 Beta II received a larger Lycoming O-360 engine derated for sea-level operation. It allows greater altitudes for hovering in and out of ground effect (HIGE/HOGE). The R22 Beta II also made the engine speed governor standard and included a carburetor heat assist, which correlates adding carburetor heat with a decrease in collective control. Only the basic skid style is currently being sold.

=== Controls ===
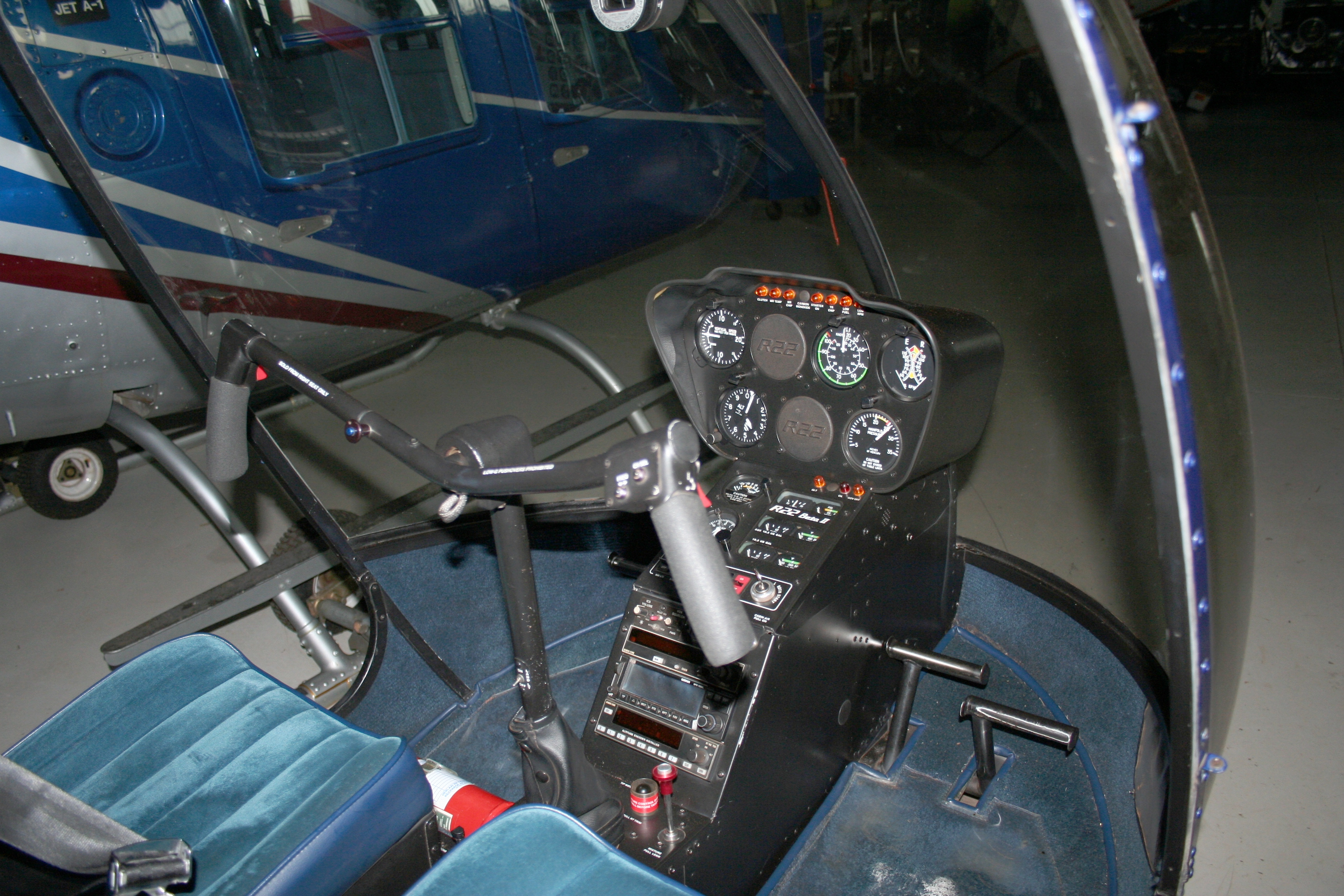
The R22's cockpit, showing its unique "T-Bar" control

Instead of floor-mounted cyclic sticks between the pilot's knees, the R22 uses a unique teetering "T-Bar" control connected to a stick that emerges from the console between the seats. This makes it easier for occupants to enter and exit the cabin and reduces chances for injury in the event of a hard landing. The teetering bar has a hand grip on both sides that hangs down between the pilots' legs. Thus, if teetered to the right, the right-side pilot would be flying and the left grip would be about 12 inches above the left pilot's lap. R22 flight instructors learn to fly with their hand in the air. The left part of the bar, left collective control, and left tail-rotor pedals can be removed if the left-seat occupant is not going to pilot the aircraft. A floor-mounted, foot-activated push-to-talk switch facilitates intercom communications for the left-seat occupant, although some later models may be equipped with a voice-activated intercom system.

The helicopter rotor system consists of a two-bladed main rotor and two-bladed antitorque rotor on the tail, each equipped with a teetering hinge. The main rotor rotates counterclockwise when viewed from above, i.e. with the right-side blade moving forward. The main rotor is also equipped with a coning hinge for each blade. Collective and cyclic pitch inputs to the main rotor are transmitted through pushrods and a conventional swashplate mechanism. Control inputs to the tail rotor are transmitted through a single pushrod inside the aluminum tail cone.

To ease the pilot's workload, a mechanical throttle correlator adjusts the throttle as the collective pitch control is raised or lowered. The pilot needs to make only small adjustments by twisting the throttle grip on the collective throughout the flight regime. Later models are also equipped with an electronic governor, which works to maintain engine speed within normal operating limits (between 97 and 104%); the governor is active when the engine is running only above 80% and is most effective in normal flight conditions. Robinson introduced the governor to ease pilot workload and to reduce instances of main rotor stall due to low rotor RPM. The governor can be switched on or off with a toggle switch located at the end of the pilot's collective pitch control. When the governor is not engaged, a yellow caution light glows on the instrument panel.

=== Powerplant ===
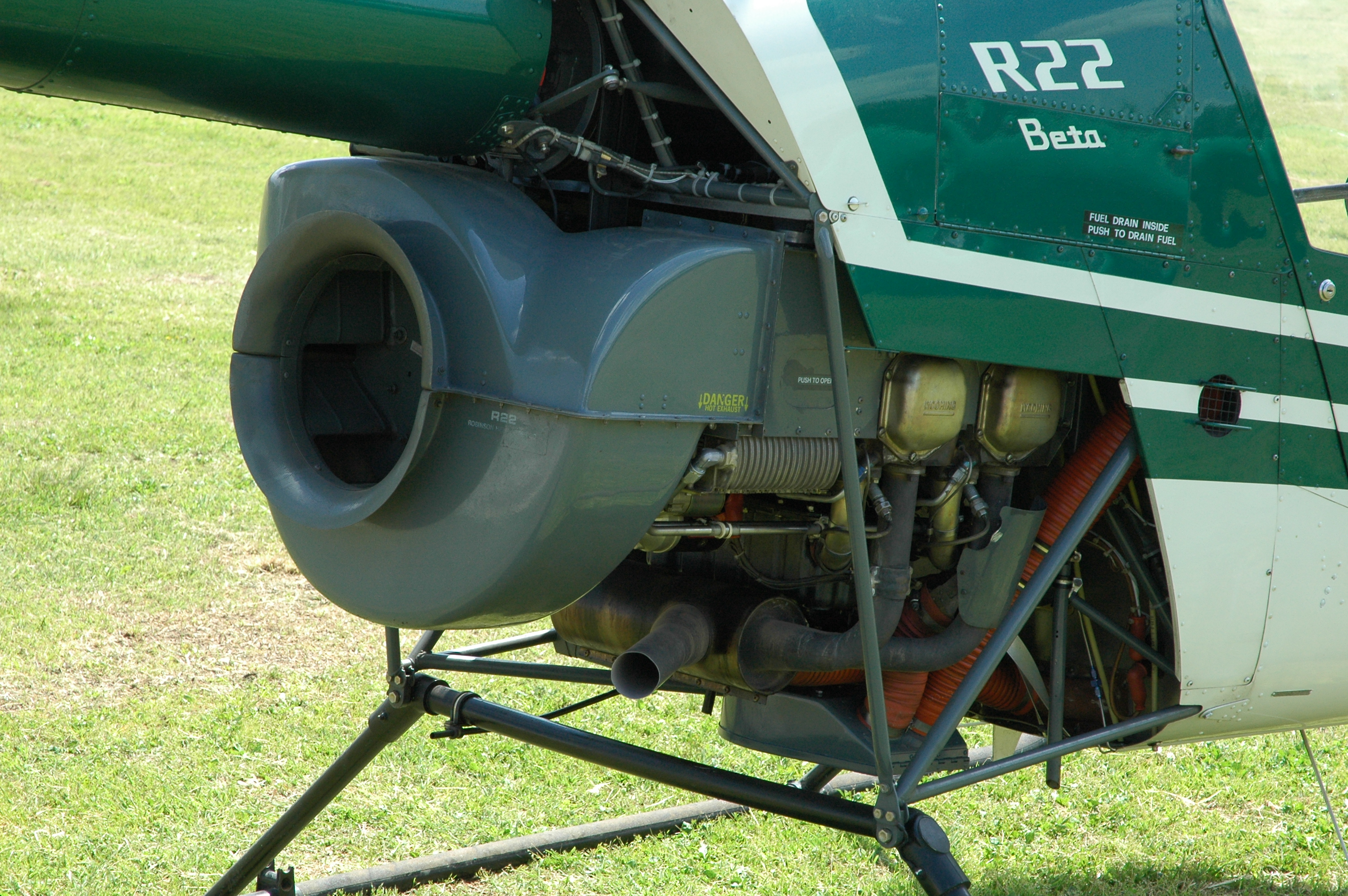
Lycoming O-320 mounted in a Robinson R22 Beta

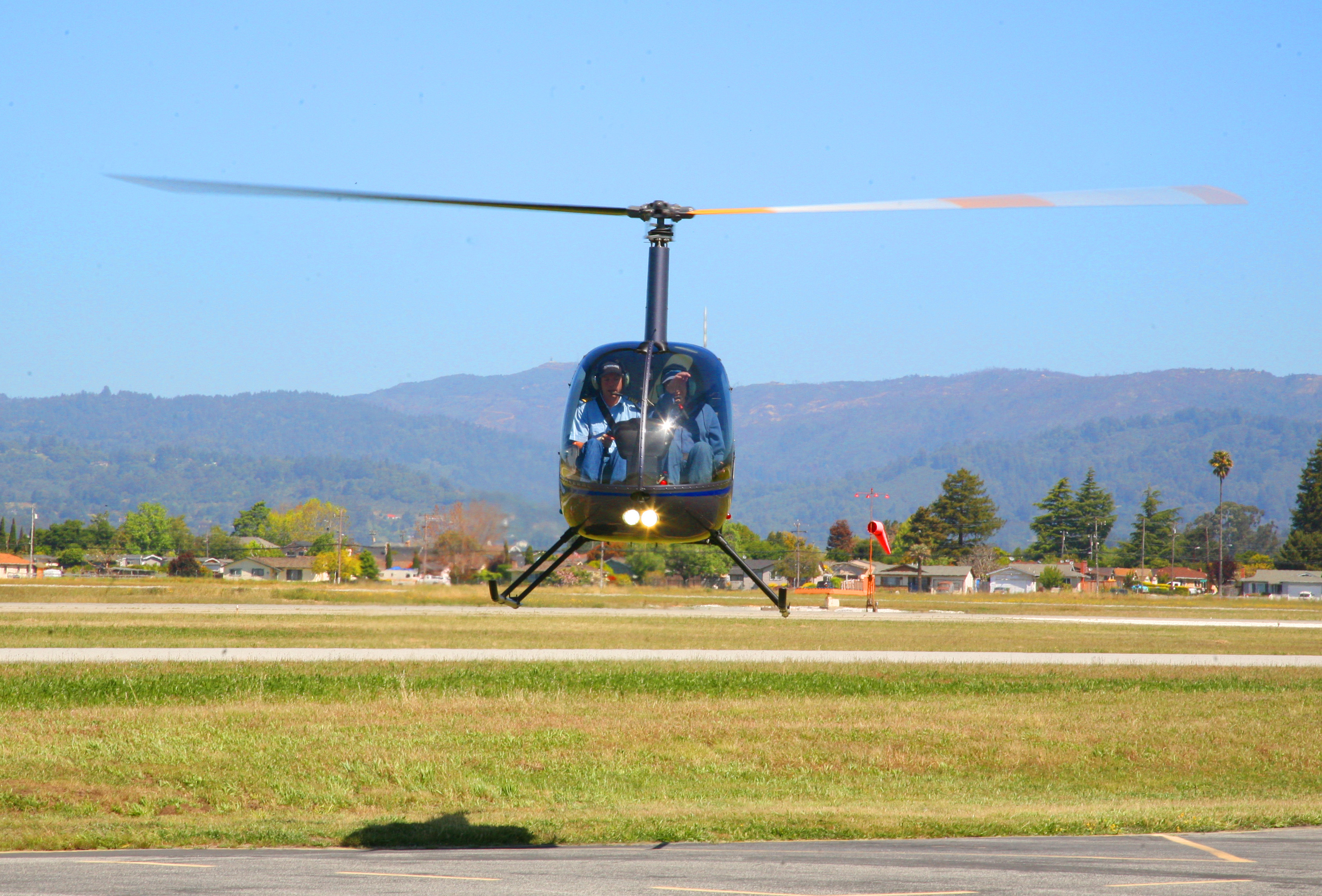
The R22 is a simple and tight design.

The R22 uses a horizontally mounted Lycoming O-320 (O-360-J2A on the Beta II), flat-four, air-cooled, naturally aspirated, carburetor-equipped, reciprocating engine. It is fueled with 100LL grade aviation gasoline. JTI Air Holdings, Inc., offers an STC allowing use of 91+ octane non-ethanol automotive gasoline. Cooling is provided through a direct-drive, squirrel-cage cooling fan. At sea level, it is derated, or operated at less than maximum power, which has been attributed to the company wishing for the power unit to maintain the same performance at sea level as it does at altitude. As the air becomes thinner with increasing altitude, maximum available horsepower decreases, reaching a point where the throttle can be completely open and rotor speed is controlled by collective lever position. By derating the engine at sea level, the R22 achieves acceptable high-altitude performance without use of supercharging or turbocharging, thus saving the weight, cost, complexity, unreliability, and shortened engine life of a forced induction system.

A carburetor is used to provide the air-fuel mixture. Carbureted engines are susceptible to carburetor icing, a condition most likely to occur in conditions of a low 11 °C (20 °F) difference between the outside air temperature and dew point (the "dew point spread"), as well as visible signs of moisture in the atmosphere. Icing can lead to loss of engine power, and if not corrected, total shutdown of the engine. A carburetor heat control is used to supply heated air to the carburetor; this can prevent or cure icing, but also causes a reduction in engine power output because hot air is less dense, enriching the fuel-air mixture. The carburetor heat control is a simple plunger-type control mounted on the center console near the collective pitch control lever. Pulling the control up slides a gate valve near the carburetor that admits warm air from a scoop on the exhaust system. The R22 employs a carburetor air temperature gauge, marked to indicate temperatures conducive to icing. The Beta II version of the R22 also includes a "carburetor heat assist", which automatically applies carburetor heat when the collective lever is lowered below a certain point. When icing conditions are present, carburetor heat is required to prevent icing around the butterfly valve from the pressure drop at that point. As the carburetor air temperature (CAT) indicator does not read correctly below 18 in Hg (457 mm Hg) of intake manifold air pressure, icing conditions require applying full carburetor heat below 18 in Hg of manifold pressure. A placard indicating this requirement is located on the CAT indicator and in the pilot's operating handbook.

Power is transmitted from the engine to the drive system through drive belts. Originally, the R22 used four separate v-belts running on multigroove sheaves. This system proved problematic, as individual belts sometimes rolled over in their groove and fail. As a temporary measure, in 1982, R22 operators received a kit from Robinson that was installed in the cockpit and on the belt tension actuator, isolating the tensioning circuits and locking the clutch/drive system at take-off tension. The problem was ultimately solved by replacing the four individual v-belts with two dual v-belts. The upper, driven sheave is mounted on the main/tail rotor drive shaft incorporating flexible couplings, and is raised and lowered relative to the engine-mounted, driving sheave by means of a belt tension actuator. During shutdown, the actuator is used to lower the upper sheave to loosen the drive belts. For startup, the engine is started with the belts loose, allowing the engine to run without spinning the rotor system. Immediately after engine start, the clutch switch located in the cockpit is closed by the pilot, powering the actuator to slowly raise the upper sheave to flight position, which tightens the belts. The actuator is thereafter controlled by pressure-sensing column springs, automatically maintaining proper belt tension during flight as the belts wear and stretch. The shaft on which the upper sheave is mounted drives both the main and tail rotors; the main gear box delivers power to the main rotor shaft through a set of splash-lubricated spiral bevel gears.

A one-way sprag clutch is built into the center of the upper sheave to allow the rotor system to continue to rotate in the event of engine failure, allowing the R22 to enter autorotation and land in a controlled manner. Because the main rotor has very little mass and inertia, autorotation in an R22 requires careful and proper execution to assure a successful outcome. Much time is spent in training practicing various types of autorotation. Target speed in an autorotation is 65 kn (120 km/h) and the glide ratio is approximately 4:1 in maximum-glide configuration.

=== Ground handling ===
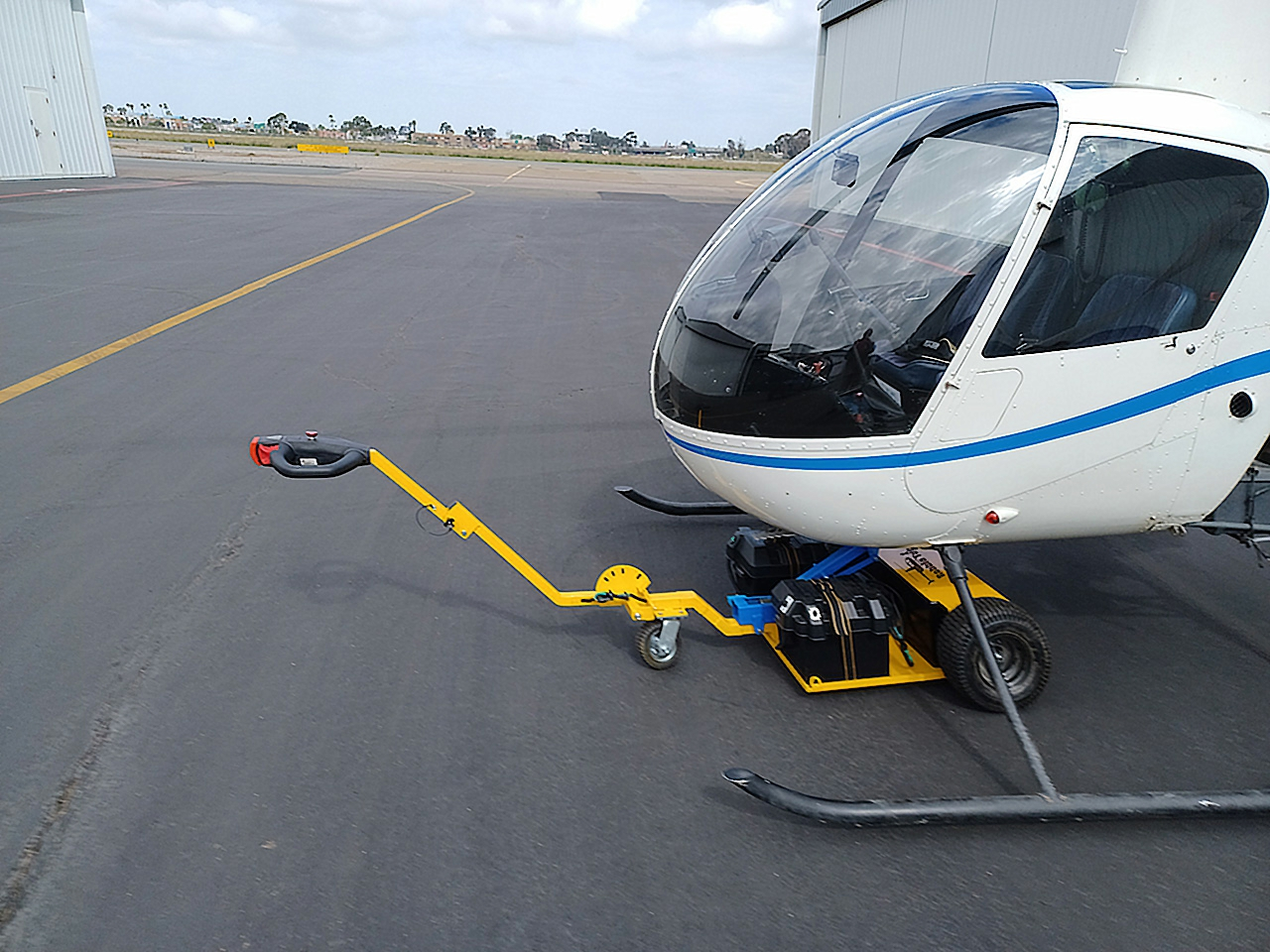
Robinson Helicopter Tow Cart Connected to R22

R22’s are equipped with wheel mounts toward the rear of the skids, one on each side, for attachment of removable wheels. The wheels must be removed prior to flight. These brackets are slightly behind the helicopter center of gravity so when the wheels are installed, the helicopter sits nose low. The wheel assembly has a pivot pin which is inserted into the skid-mounted bracket and then rotated over center to lift the rear of the skids about 2 inches leaving the front of the skids on the ground. The helicopter can be moved by pulling down on the tail to lift the front of the skids off the ground. One person can move the helicopter though this is difficult over any distance or on a sloped surface. Another person can help by pushing on the bracing behind the engine.

R22’s with flotation attached to the skids such as the Mariner or Mariner II must have wheels installed under the skids as the bracket is not accessible.

R22’s manufactured after 1991 include a ¾” diameter tow ball mounted on the bottom of the fuselage, near the front and offset slightly to the left. A tow cart or tug can be engaged with the ball and then used to lift the front of the helicopter to clear the skids from the ground after the wheels are installed and rotated to lift the rear of the skids. This makes it possible for a single person to move the helicopter, even over significant distances or not-level surfaces.

Tow carts are available with a variety of features. There exist manual versions which place the ball mating device behind the wheels so the operator engages the ball then pushes down on the handle to lift the nose. Others provide a repurposed car-style hydraulic jack to lift the nose. Others provide an electric jack.

Tow carts are available with no motive power, a gas engine or one or two electric motors operated from one or two batteries. Some of the non-powered tow carts are set up to be towed such as behind a golf cart or quad cycle. One manufacturer offered a modified pallet jack.

The other option for ground handling is a landing platform which is large enough for the helicopter to safely land on, has wheels underneath and can be towed between the hangar and the take-off location. These are heavy and must be towed with a vehicle. R22’s are light enough to move they are rarely loaded onto platforms.

=== Transport ===
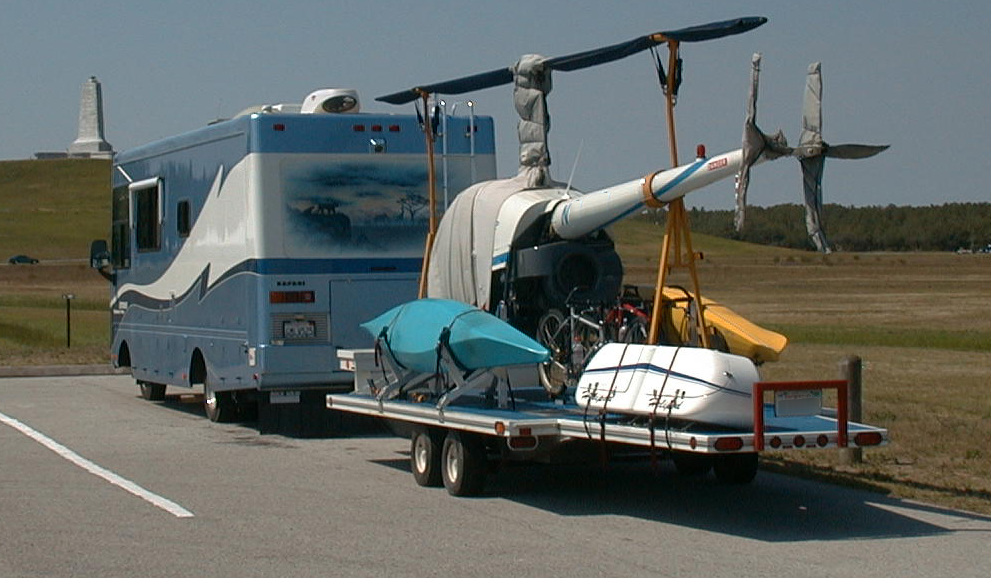
Robinson R22 helicopter on a trailer

The two-bladed rotor and the small size of the R22 make transporting the helicopter without blade folding or dismantling tasks possible. Transporting the R22 requires securing the tail boom and rotor blades to a truck or trailer bed, which must be torsionally rigid to prevent motion and stresses being applied to the helicopter during transportation. Take off and landing directly onto a trailer is possible.

== Variants ==
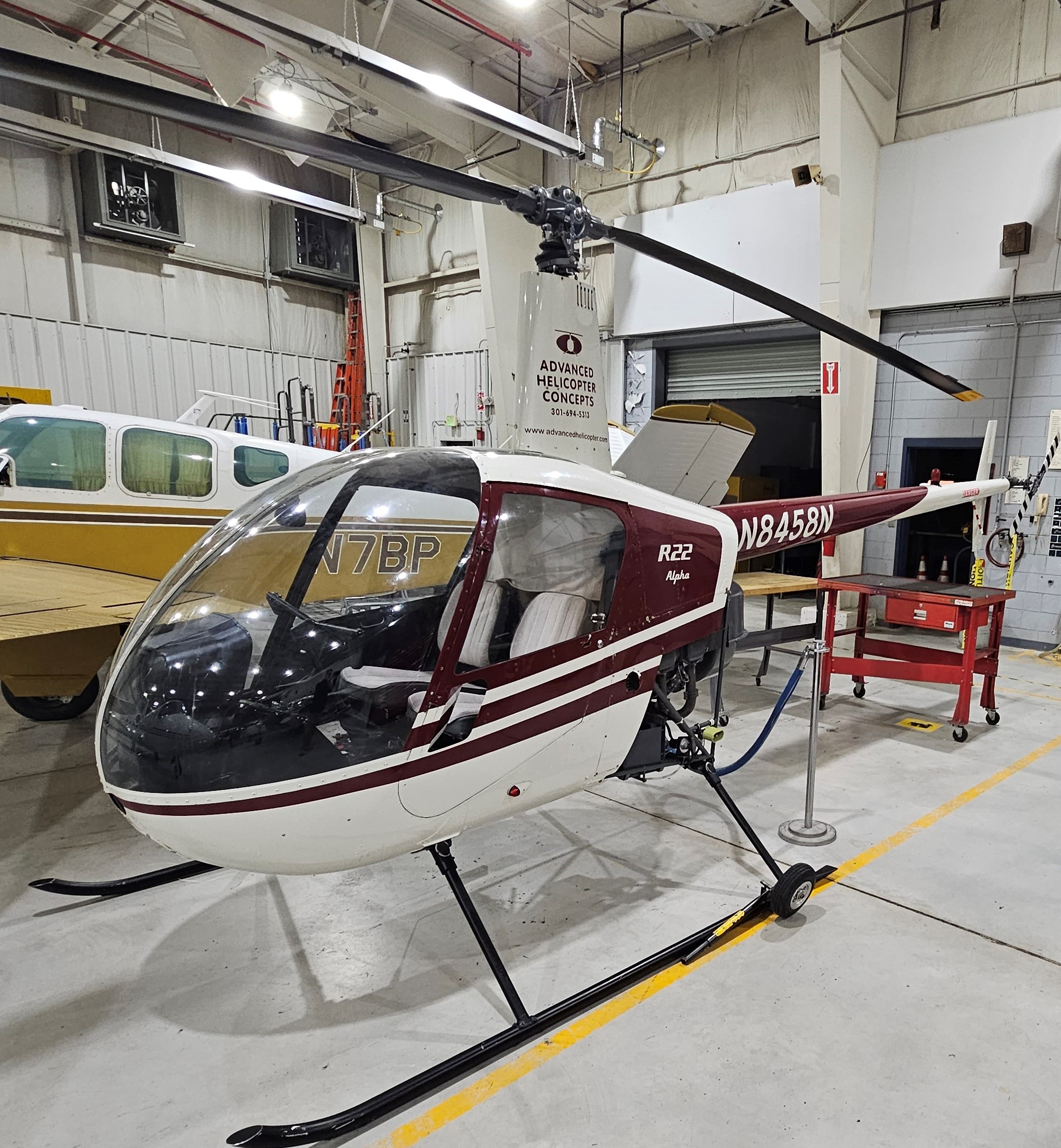
Robinson R22 Alpha variant, built after 1983

R22
The initial production version, it is powered by a Lycoming O-320-A2B or A2C piston engine.
R22 HP
A higher-powered version, it has a 160 bhp Lycoming O-320-B2C piston engine.
R22 Alpha
This improved version, certified in 1983, is powered by a Lycoming O-320-B2C piston engine.
R22 Beta
Fitted with a more powerful engine, it is powered by a Lycoming O-320-B2C piston engine.
R22 Beta II

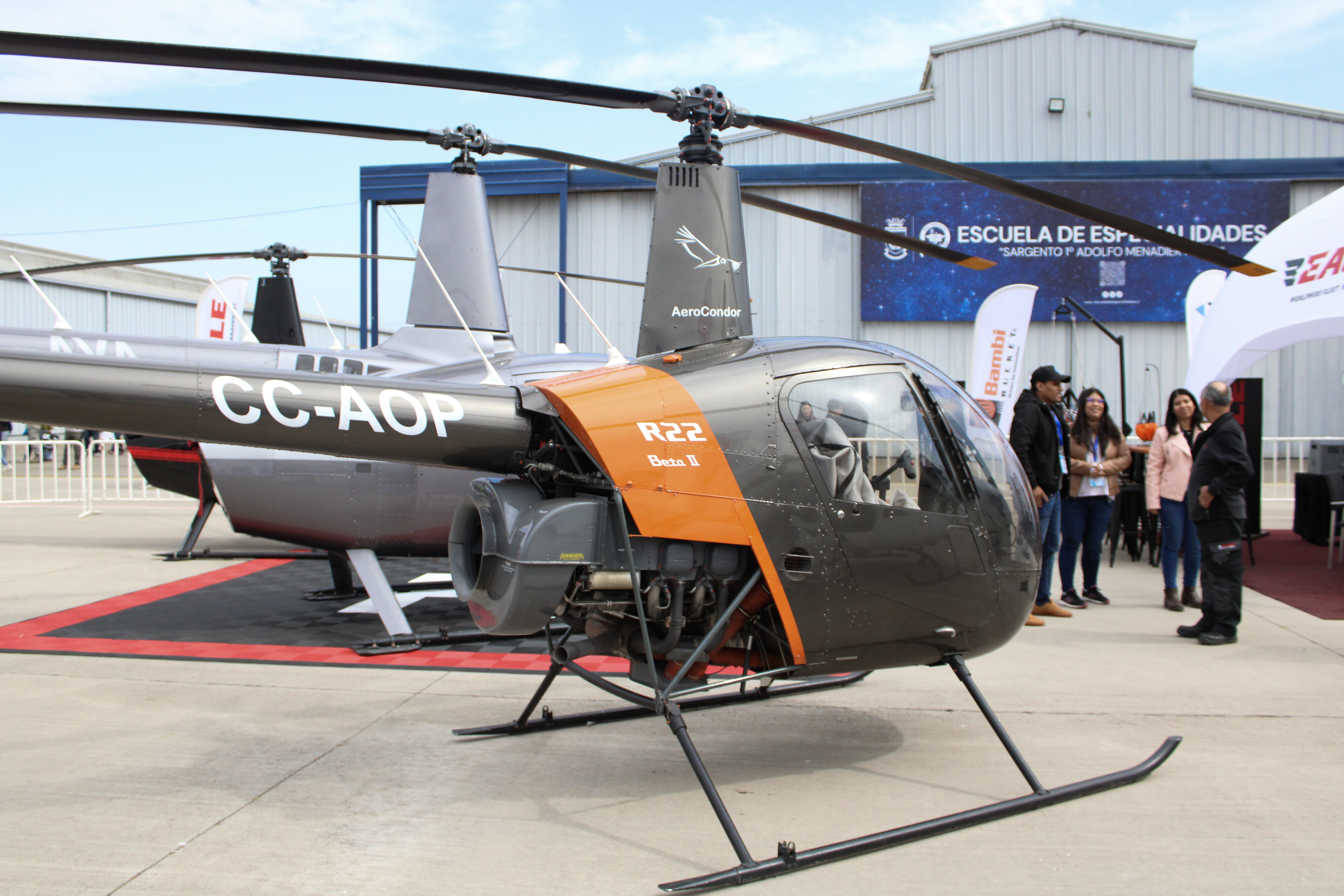
A R22 Beta II

Fitted with a more powerful engine, it is powered by a Lycoming O-360-J2A piston engine.
R22 Beta II Police
This police patrol version is equipped with a searchlight and loudspeaker.
R22 Mariner
Designed for off-shore work, it is fitted with floats and a Lycoming O-320-B2C piston engine, and is limited to daylight operations when fitted with floats.
R22 Mariner II
Designed for off-shore work, it is fitted with floats and a Lycoming O-360-J2A piston engine, and is limited to daylight operations when fitted with floats.
R22 Police
Police version
R22 IFR
Designed for IFR training, it has a larger, 10-hole panel to accommodate additional instruments. It is not IFR certified, so training must be done with a safety pilot in VFR conditions.
Maverick UAV
Unmanned military version marketed by Boeing
Renegade UAV
Unmanned R&D version built for DARPA

=== Unmanned derivatives ===
The R22 is the basis for Boeing's Maverick military unmanned aerial vehicle helicopter, and its Renegade version. In 1999, Frontier Systems developed a remotely piloted R22, the Maverick. This aircraft, along with the company, was later acquired by Boeing Phantom Works. In 2003, the United States Navy purchased four aircraft, equipped with Wescam electro-optical/infrared systems.

Boeing then modified one of the Mavericks further, calling it the Renegade, under contract with the Defense Advanced Research Projects Agency as a research testbed to develop software for its A160 Hummingbird. The software system, known as the software enabled control (SEC) program, was developed by Boeing and teams from the University of California, Berkeley, Georgia Institute of Technology, and Massachusetts Institute of Technology, and was first flown on May 26, 2005. During the flight, the SEC assumed control of the aircraft to "execute autonomous maneuvering algorithms". The software allows the aircraft to autonomously select "optimal routes through a field of pop-up and known threats; flying low-level, terrain-hugging profiles to avoid detection; and determining safe landing zones using vision-based algorithms to process landing site imagery and terrain height information."

== Operators ==
The R22 is operated by many private individuals, companies, and flying clubs. In Australia, where 489 R22s were registered as of mid-2011, a survey found that 62% of the fleet's flying time was in mustering operations, while 13% of hours were spent in training pilots. Many broadcasters used the R22 until the mid-1990s, when the financial landscape of radio broadcasting in the U.S. changed due to deregulation of the industry.

=== Military and government operators ===
Croatia

- Croatian Police

Dominican Republic

- Dominican Republic Army

Philippines

- Philippine Navy

Turkey

- Turkish Land Forces

== Accidents and incidents ==
Since the R22 received FAA certification in March 1979, Robinson has delivered 4,800 R22 helicopters up to 2019. The R22 had 182 fatal accidents between March 1979 and June 2010 from a total of 1,230 incidents. In late 1981, the R22 had its type certificate temporarily revoked by the Federal Aviation Administration due to delamination of a main rotor blade. The cause of the delamination was determined to be contamination of one of the bonded parts during a priming operation performed at an outside vendor. In response, Robinson Helicopter Company instituted stringent quality procedures and requirements, and replaced all main rotor blades on the fleet of 33 helicopters in service at the time.

In the early 1980s, the R22 experienced a number of student-pilot related accidents due to the R22's use as a primary flight trainer. Believing the number of accidents was the result of insufficient training and lax standards, Robinson established the Robinson Pilot Safety Course in 1982 to educate Certified Flight Instructors transitioning from larger helicopters to the new, smaller R22. After the introduction of the Robinson Pilot Safety Course, the rate of fatal R22 accidents declined from 3.7 per 100,000 flight hours in 1983 to 0.97 per 100,000 flight hours for the 12 months preceding July 1995. Robinson's statistics show the rate of fatal R22 accidents per 100,000 flight hours fell from 6.0 in 1982 to 0.7 in 1997. As of 2012, more than 17,000 students have gone through the course.

On April 11, 2024 a Robinson R22 helicopter of the Philippine Navy crashed near a public market in Cavite City in the Philippines while on a training flight, killing its two pilots. It was the last R22 model helicopter in the inventory of the Philippine Navy.

== Specifications (R22) ==
(These specifications are for the original R22, which is no longer in production. Later variants have different specifications.)

Data from Robinson R22 Pilot's Operating Handbook., R22 Introduction and Specifications

General characteristics

- Crew: 1/2
- Capacity: 1/0
- Length: 28 ft 8 in (8.74 m)
- Height: 8 ft 11 in (2.72 m)
- Empty weight: 880 lb (399 kg)
- Max takeoff weight: 1,370 lb (621 kg)
- Fuel capacity:

- Main tank total capacity: 16.9 US gal (14 imp gal; 64 L)
- Optional auxiliary tank total capacity: 10.9 US gal (9 imp gal; 41 L)

- Powerplant: 1 × Lycoming O-320-A2B or -A2C 4-cylinder air-cooled horizontally-opposed piston engine, 124 hp (92 kW)
- Main rotor diameter: 25 ft 2 in (7.67 m)
- Main rotor area: 497 sq ft (46.2 m^{2})
- Tail rotor diameter: 3 ft 6 in (1.1 m)
- Blade section: - NACA 63-015

Performance

- Cruise speed: 96 kn (110 mph, 178 km/h)
- Never exceed speed: 102 kn (117 mph, 189 km/h)
- Range: 209 nmi (241 mi, 387 km)
- Service ceiling: 14,000 ft (4,300 m)
- Rate of climb: 1,200 ft/min (6.1 m/s)
- Disk loading: 2.61 lb/sq ft (12.7 kg/m^{2})
- Power/mass: 0.095 hp/lb (0.156 kW/kg)
- Fuel consumption: 8–10 gal/h (7–8 imp gal/h; 30–38 L/h)

== See also ==
Related development

- Robinson R66
- Robinson R44

Aircraft of comparable role, configuration, and era

- Aero Eli Serviza Yo-Yo 222, an Italian copy
- Brantly B-2
- Enstrom F-28
- Guimbal Cabri G2
- Schweizer 300C

Related lists

- List of most-produced rotorcraft
