= Rotor Technologies =

American aircraft company

- Company type: Private
- Industry: Aerospace
- Founded: 2021
- Founder: Hector Xu
- Headquarters: Nashua, New Hampshire

Rotor Technologies is an unmanned aerial vehicle company founded by Hector Xu and based in Nashua, New Hampshire. In 2024, the company began producing and testing two models of unmanned helicopters: a general utility aircraft called the Airtruck, as well as an agricultural aircraft called the Sprayhawk.

== History ==
=== 2020–2021: origins, founding ===
In 2020, during the COVID-19 pandemic, Xu took lessons in Nashua, New Hampshire to fly helicopters; at the time, he was a postdoctoral researcher in aerospace engineering at the Massachusetts Institute of Technology (MIT). Realizing the "pretty terrifying" experience of flying a helicopter and recognizing its potential for "human error," Xu considered how technological advancements could make helicopter flight safer—he subsequently began researching unmanned aircraft systems.

In 2021, Xu founded Rotor Technologies in a hangar in Nashua, New Hampshire and secured eight figures in funding. From then on, Xu would hire many staff from MIT to form his core team and partner with various college facilities like MIT's Venture Mentoring Service and Industrial Liaison Program as well as the National Science Foundation's campus program for innovators. In order to develop autonomous flight technology, Xu and his team decided to retrofit used helicopters from the Robinson Helicopter Company to save time and cost while also providing customers a potentially familiar aircraft.

=== 2021–present: Sprayhawks, agriculture ===
Over time, Rotor Technologies realized a "huge untapped market" for semi-autonomous helicopters in the agricultural industry. Xu stated: "People would call us up and say, 'hey, I want to use this for crop dusting, can I?' We'd say, OK maybe." Through the year, the company focused on applying semi-autonomous flight technology to the agriculture sector, specifically for productive purposes like spraying cropland with fertilizer and pesticide, combatting wildfires, and moving cargo between sites.

That year, Rotor Technologies built two semi-autonomous helicopters—each a nearly $1 million Robinson R44 that the company has called a "Sprayhawk." At the time of its creation, it was "the largest agricultural drone available in the world" and "features a 120-gallon spray tank with 33-foot spray booms" which allowed it to match the spray capacity of a manned helicopter. Additionally, the helicopter was equipped with "flight computers and communications systems allowing it to be operated remotely" as well as several cameras, lasers, GPS, and other internals. In the event of a contingency, the helicopter "has a system which Xu referred to as a big, red button that ensures the engine can be shut off and the helicopter perform a controlled landing."

After the first two Sprayhawks were produced, Rotor Technologies began testing flights in anticipation of deliveries to "early-access partners throughout spring 2025". In November, Rotor Technologies announced a partnership with AG-NAV, a "precision navigation and flow control technology" company, in order to aid development of the Sprayhawk's unmanned capabilities. On November 20, the company publicly debuted an Federal Aviation Administration-approved test flight with a Sprayhawk at the National Agricultural Aviation Association's trade show at the Perot Field Fort Worth Alliance Airport in Texas. The event was hosted in partnership with the Federal Aviation Administration, the Helicopter Institute, and Hillwood.

In 2024, Rotor Technologies also developed and produced another aircraft model, the Airtruck (also based on the Robinson R44), which is purposed to be a "heavy-lift multiuse drone, adaptable for a variety of applications" and, according to Xu, the aviation equivalent of a pickup truck. Specifically, the Airtruck is intended to be able to be able to carry a payload of a thousand pounds. One production model has been completed.

By the summer of 2024, Sprayhawks and Airtrucks were available for pre-order for customers in the United States and Brazil with anticipated delivery dates in 2025 or 2026. Due to the helicopters' weight exceeding limits set by the Federal Aviation Administration, owners must complete certain certifications and subsequently receive a 44807 Exemption for Commercial Agricultural Operations to operate unmanned aircraft for agricultural purposes; purchase also includes additional training for users. Xu has set a goal for building 15 Sprayhawks and 10 Airtrucks to sell and deliver in 2025: "I think 2025 will be production hell as Elon Musk calls it."
