= Robinson Helicopter Company =

American helicopter manufacturer

- Type: Private
- Industry: Aerospace
- Founded: 1973; 53 years ago
- Founder: Frank D. Robinson
- Headquarters: Torrance, California, US
- Key people: Kurt Robinson (President & Chairman)
- Products: Helicopters
- Revenue: US$200 million
- Number of employees: 1,300
- Website: robinsonheli.com

The Robinson Helicopter Company, based at Zamperini Field in Torrance, California, is an American helicopter manufacturer. As of 2024, Robinson produces three models: the two-seat R22, the four-seat R44, both of which use Lycoming piston engines, and the five-seat R66, which uses Rolls-Royce turbine engines. In March 2025, concept for the ten-seat R88, which uses the Safran Arriel 2W turbine, was announced.

== History ==
The company was founded in 1973 by Frank Robinson, a former employee of Bell Helicopter and Hughes Helicopters. Since delivering its first helicopter in 1979, Robinson Helicopter has produced over 12,000 aircraft.

Plans for production of the Robinson R66 were announced in March 2007. It is a five-seat helicopter of similar configuration to the R44, but with the addition of a luggage compartment, wider cabin by 8 in (20 cm), and powered by a Rolls-Royce RR300 gas turbine engine.

In 2013, Robinson was the global market leader, selling 523 light helicopters, a 1% increase from 2012. Production in 2014 dropped to 329 aircraft. In 2015, Robinson produced one R22, four or five R44s, and one or two R66s per week, and contracted with Rolls-Royce to supply 100 RR300 turbines per year for 10 years for the R66. The factory can produce up to 1,000 helicopters per year.

In 2024, Robinson bought Ascent Aerosystems, a maker of drones for the government & military.

== Products ==
- Robinson R22
- Robinson R44
- Robinson R66
- Robinson R88
- Robinson Unmanned’s R44 Airtruck and Sprayhawk (formerly R550X in cooperation with Rotor Technologies, Inc.)

Robinson also produces the Robinson Helipad, a modular helipad designed for light helicopters.

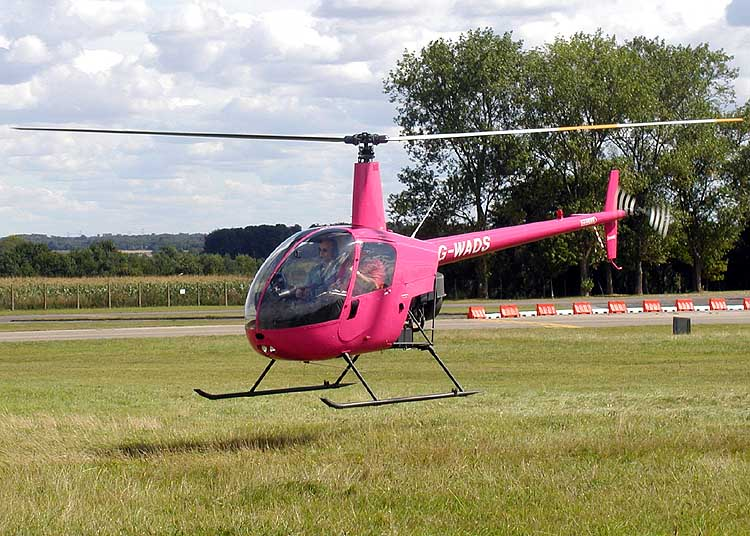
Robinson R22 Beta

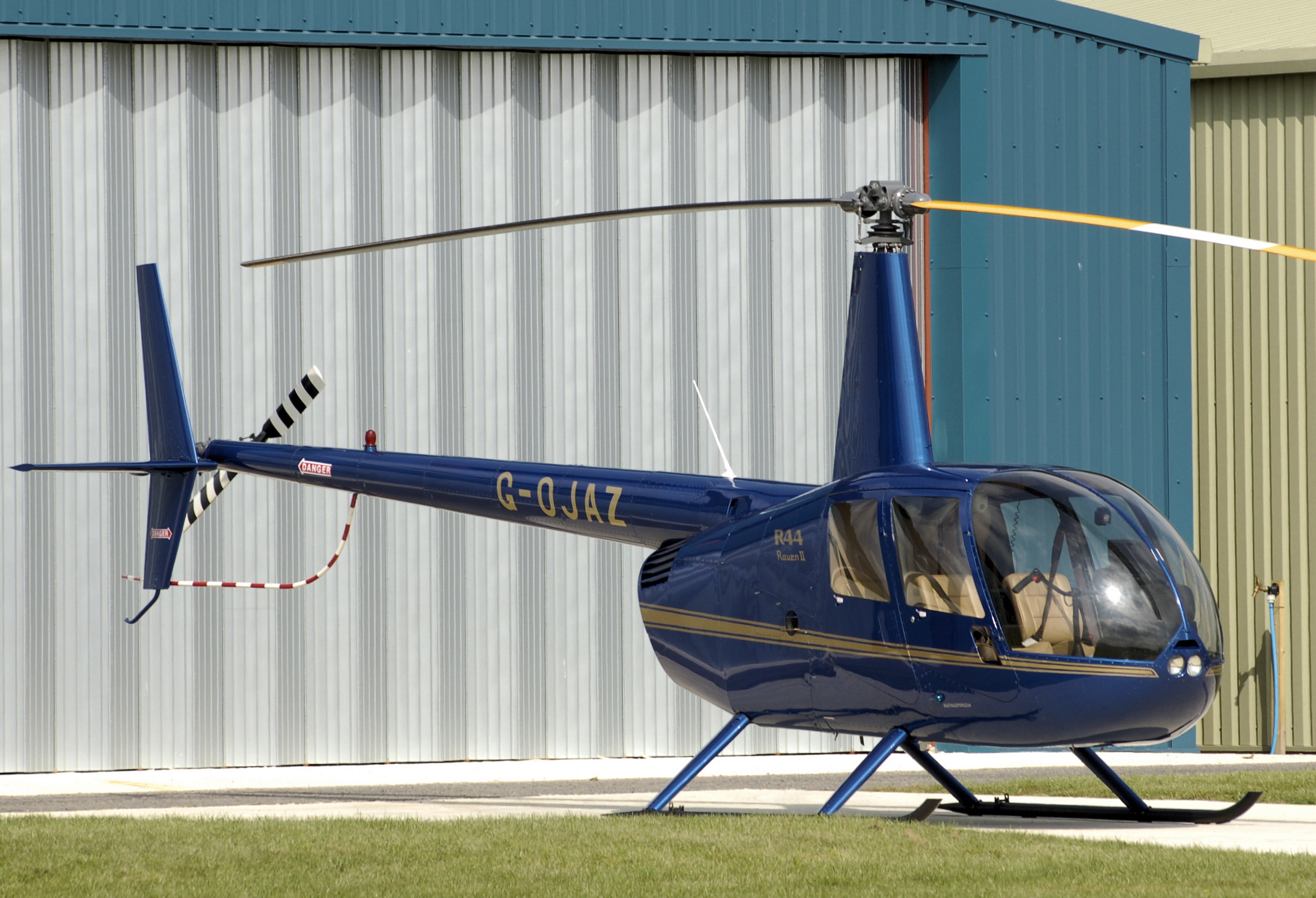
Robinson R44 Raven II

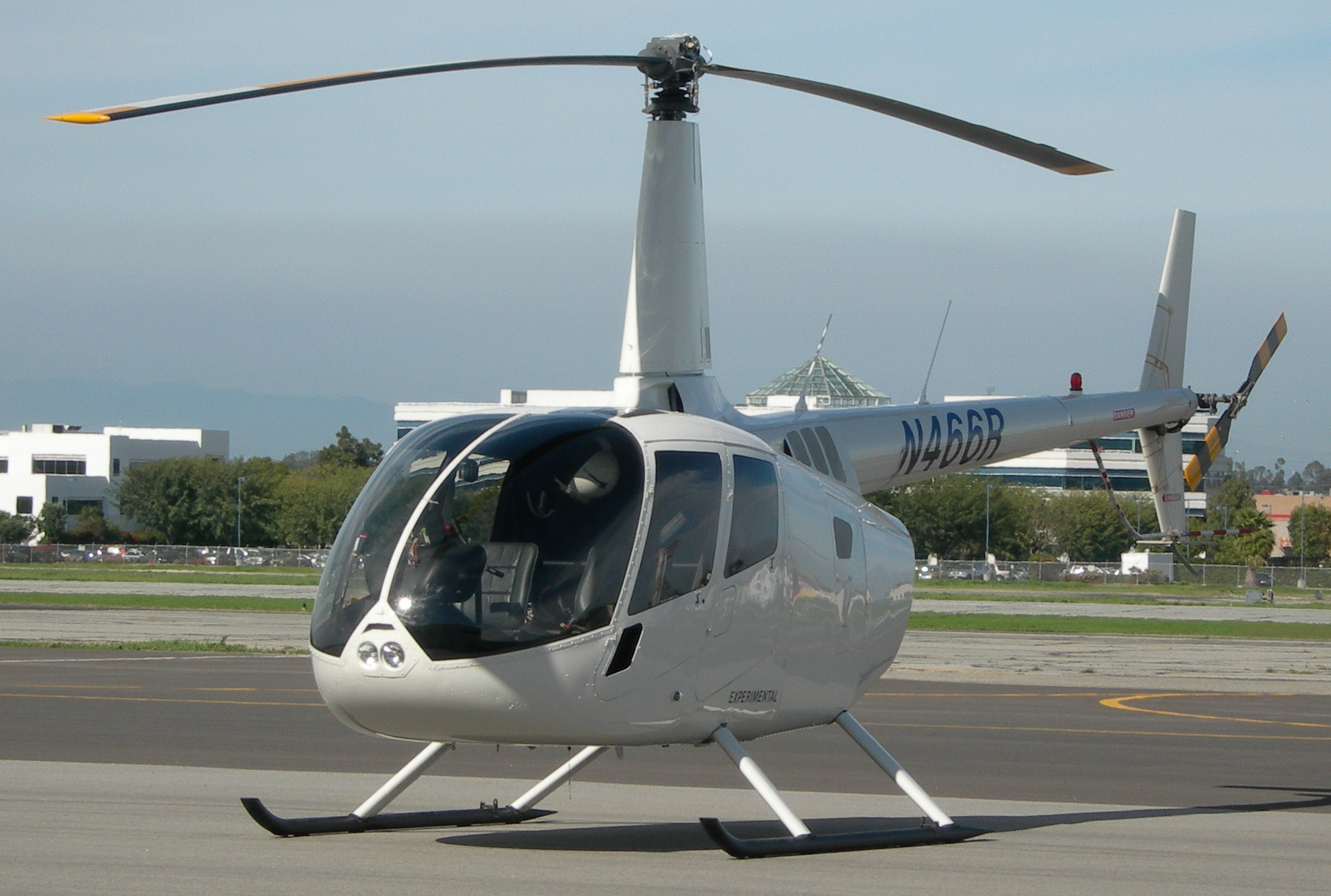
Robinson R66 Turbine

== Mast-bumping issues ==
Mast bumping is a dangerous condition helicopters can encounter when load on the helicopter's rotor assembly is temporarily reduced during flight (for example, during a low-g maneuver or turbulent weather). The reduction of load triggers excessive flapping in the helicopter's rotor blades, which can cause the entire rotor assembly to shear off the aircraft.

Robinson helicopters use a patented design for their main rotor, with a triple-hinged rotor assembly "teetering" atop an extended mast. Several Robinson helicopters have been destroyed in incidents where mast bumping was determined to have occurred. A May 2018 article in the Los Angeles Times reported Robinson helicopters seemed to have increased susceptibility to mast-bumping incidents.

In 2016, the New Zealand Transport Accident Investigation Commission (TAIC) released a report summarizing 14 mast-bumping accidents or incidents involving Robinson helicopters in New Zealand, in which 18 people died. The TAIC report noted that "Helicopters with semirigid, two-bladed main rotor systems, as used on Robinson helicopters, are particularly susceptible to mast bumping in "low-G" conditions".

In 2018, a U.S. lawsuit accused the Robinson Helicopter Company of defective manufacturing after a mast-bumping event caused the in-flight breakup of an R66 helicopter.

A number of fatal accidents in Australia have been attributed to mast-bumping. In 2020, an R44 crashed in the Bungonia State Recreation Area while flying in valleys between ridgelines. The in-flight breakup was found to have occurred due to mast-bumping and the Australian Transport Safety Bureau (ATSB) recommended the installation of audio and video recording devices in the helicopters to study the phenomenon further and educate pilots how to avoid similar accidents. Another in-flight breakup involving an R22 in October 2022 at Cowcowing Lakes near Cowcowing in Western Australia was attributed to mast bumping, but the exact circumstances leading to the crash could not be determined without video. An in-flight break up of an R66 near Hawks Nest, New South Wales in October 2023 was the first such accident that was captured by recording devices fitted by Robinson Helicopter Company in response to the ATSB recommendation. The video footage showed that the pilot had been flying on autopilot and was distracted flying too fast in turbulent conditions, which created a low-g condition, before mishandling the aircraft when attempting to respond.
