= Frank D. Robinson =

American aerospace engineer (1930–2022)

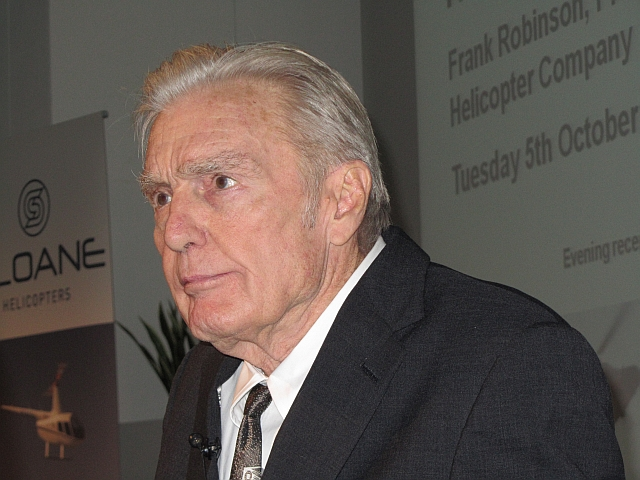
- Robinson in 2010
- Born: January 14, 1930; Carbonado, Washington, U.S.
- Died: November 12, 2022 (aged 92); Rolling Hills, California, U.S.
- Occupations: Entrepreneur, aeronautical engineer
- Years active: 1957–2010
- Known for: Founder of the Robinson Helicopter Company, designer of the Robinson R22, R44, and R66
- Children: 6

Franklin Davis Robinson (January 14, 1930 – November 12, 2022) was an American aeronautical engineer and the founder of Robinson Helicopter Company in Torrance, California. He served as president, chief executive officer, and chairman of the company for many years. In the early 1970s, Robinson designed the Robinson R22 helicopter, a popular, light, two-place civilian aircraft, which later developed into the R44, one of the most successful civilian helicopters in history.

== Life and career ==
Robinson was born in Carbonado in Washington, the youngest of four children. His father worked as a coal miner, saw mill operator, and fishing-resort owner. He received his BSME degree from the University of Washington in 1957, with graduate work in aeronautical engineering at the University of Wichita.

Robinson started his engineering career in 1957 at Cessna Aircraft Company working on the Cessna CH-1 Skyhook four-place helicopter. After 3 1/2 years at Cessna, he spent one year working on the certification of the Umbaugh U-17 and 4 1/2 years at McCulloch Aircraft Corporation performing design studies on inexpensive rotorcraft. Robinson worked one year at Kaman Aircraft on gyrodyne-type rotorcraft. After this, he spent two years at Bell Helicopter, where he earned a reputation as a "tail rotor expert". In 1969, he moved to Hughes Helicopters to work on a variety of research and development projects, including a new tail rotor for the Hughes 500 helicopter and work on "The Quiet One" program.

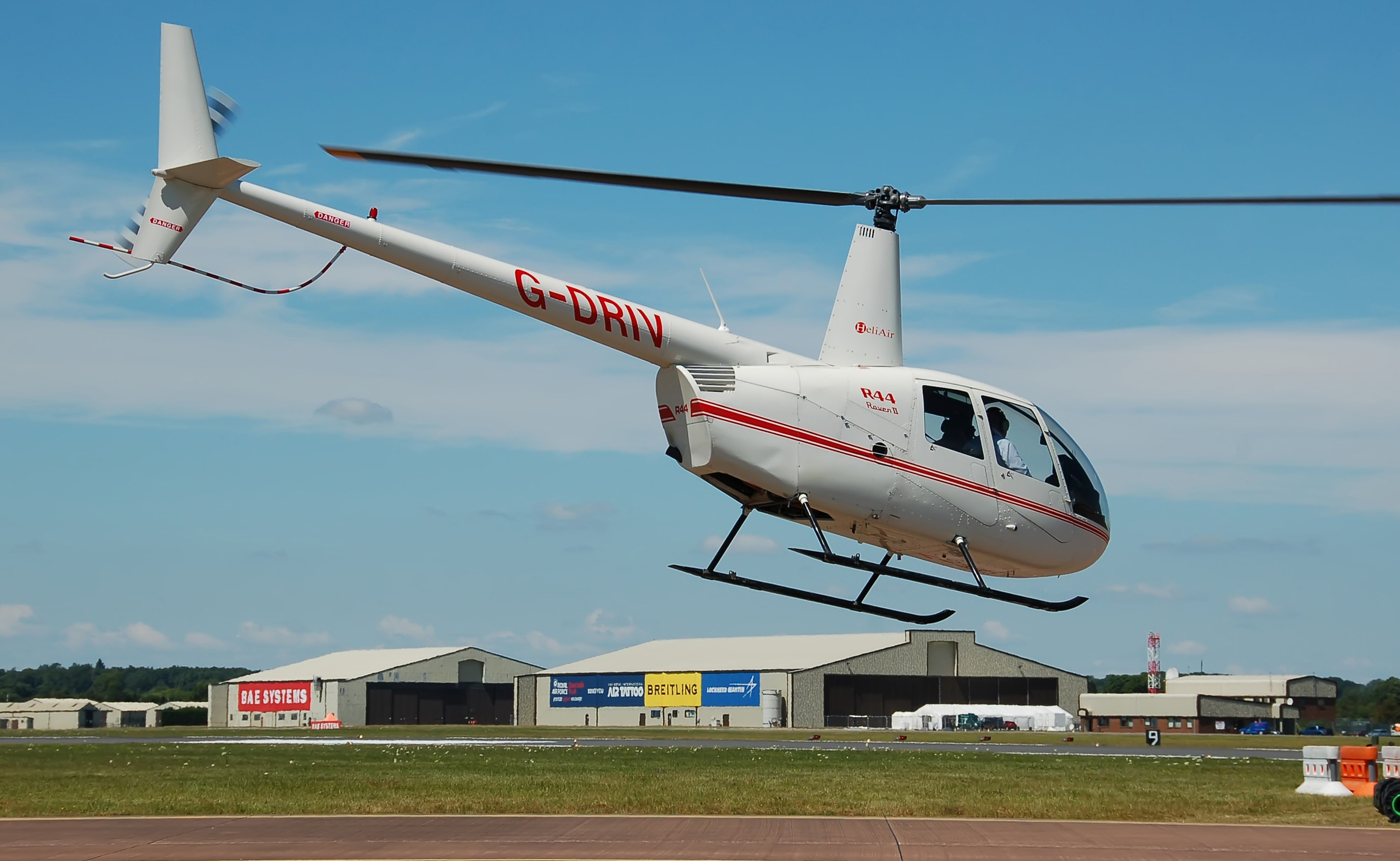
The R44 Raven II, a successor of the Robinson R22

Robinson resigned from Hughes in 1973 and founded the Robinson Helicopter Company (RHC). RHC’s first business address was Robinson’s home, where the two-seat R22 helicopter was designed. The first R22 prototype was built in a hangar at the Torrance Airport, and Robinson personally flew it on its first flight in August 1975.

The R22 led to the R44, which first flew in 1990. The aircraft became the best-selling general-aviation helicopter in the world in 1999, and has been so every year since. Over 6,000 R44s have been delivered to date.

Announced in 2007, R66 has five seats, a separate cargo compartment and is powered by a Rolls-Royce RR300 turboshaft engine. The R66 is slightly faster and smoother than the Robinson R44 from which it is derived. The R66 received both type and production certificates from the U.S. Federal Aviation Administration (FAA) on October 25, 2010.

On August 10, 2010, Frank Robinson announced his resignation as president and chairman of Robinson Helicopter Company. Robinson had intended to retire on his 80th birthday in January 2010, but elected to postpone his retirement until the design of the Robinson R66 Turbine was complete. With R66 production underway and FAA certification imminent, Robinson decided to make his retirement official. His son, Kurt Robinson, was elected by the board of directors to assume the positions of president and chairman on August 10, 2010.

Robinson died at his home in Rolling Hills, California, on November 12, 2022, at the age of 92.

== Awards and honors ==
Robinson was a recipient of the 2004 Howard Hughes Memorial Award from the Aero Club of Southern California (given to "exceptional leaders who have advanced the fields of aviation or aerospace technology", the 2010 Lifetime Aviation Engineering Award from the Kiddie Hawk Air Academy Living Legends of Aviation, and the 2013 Daniel Guggenheim Medal from the American Institute of Aeronautics and Astronautics, for his "conception, design and manufacture of a family of affordable, reliable and versatile helicopters." In 2009, Robinson was inducted into the International Air & Space Hall of Fame at the San Diego Air & Space Museum.
