= List of most-produced rotorcraft =

This is a list of the most-produced rotorcraft. Production runs typically include variants and licensed production. Aircraft still in production are highlighted in cyan .

Name	Number produced	Nation	Notes	Production period
Mil Mi-8	17,000 +	Soviet Union/Russia	Most-produced helicopter. Still in production.	1961–present
Bell UH-1 Iroquois	16,000 +	United States	Most-produced Western helicopter; nicknamed "Huey". UH-1Y derivative in production.	1959–1976
Bell 206 Jetranger	8,460	manufactured at Bell plants in United States and Canada	Also made under licence by Agusta in Italy and Commonwealth Aircraft Corporation in Australia	1966–2010
Eurocopter AS350	7,000 +	France	Airbus Helicopters H130	1975–present
Robinson R44	7700+	United States		1993–present
Bell 47	5,600	United States	Produced under license by Agusta in Italy, Kawasaki Heavy Industries in Japan, and Westland Aircraft in the United Kingdom.	1946-1974
Mil Mi-2	5,497	Soviet Union, Poland	Produced only in Poland.	1965–1998
Sikorsky UH-60 Black Hawk	5,000 +	United States	S-70 family: UH-60A (1978–1989), UH-60L (1989-2007), UH-60M (2005-), SH-60 Seahawk (1979-), in Japan as Mitsubishi H-60 (1987-).	1978–present
Robinson R22	4,800+	United States		1979–present
Hughes OH-6 Cayuse	4,700	United States	In production as MD-500 series. Also built under license by Kawasaki, Korean Air Aerospace and Breda Nardi (Agusta).	1965–present
Mil Mi-4	4,000	Soviet Union	In China as Z-5.	1951-1979
Hughes TH-55 Osage	2,800 +	United States	Later as Schweizer S-300.	1961-
Mil Mi-24	2,648 +	Soviet Union/Russia	Mi-35M version still in limited production.	1969–present
Mil Mi-1	2,594	Soviet Union	In Poland as SM-1.	1950-1965
Boeing AH-64 Apache	2,500	United States		1986-present
Sikorsky H-34	2,464	United States	Also as Westland Wessex.	1954-1970
Bell AH-1 Cobra	2,208	United States	AH-1Z model still in production.	1967–present
Eurocopter EC145	2000+	Japan-EU	In production as Airbus H145 since 2014. Includes UH-72 Lakota	2001-
Aérospatiale Alouette III	2,000 +	France	License built in Switzerland, India (as HAL Chetak), and in Romania as IAR 316.	1961-2021
Hiller OH-23 Raven	1,836 +	United States		1948-1965
Aérospatiale Gazelle	1,775	France		1967-1996
Sikorsky H-19	1,728	United States	Made under licence in United Kingdom, France and Japan.	1950-1961?
MBB Bo 105	1,640	Germany	German (1,404) plus license produced in Canada, Spain, Philippines, and Indonesia.	1967-2001
Bell 407	1,600+	United States-Canada	Derivative of the Bell 206L LongRanger	1995–
Robinson R66	1,500	United States		2007–present
Eurocopter EC135	1,400 +	Germany	Airbus Helicopters H135	1994–present
Bell 412	1,300+	United States	Huey version license made in Indonesia, Italy, and Japan	1979-
Aérospatiale Alouette II	1,303	France	including: Alouette II, SA-318C (316), Lama (407), and HAL Cheetah (240), and 7 in Brazil	1956-1975
Sikorsky SH-3 Sea King	1,300 +	United States	Sikorsky S-61 family, also made by Westland, Canada, Agusta, and Mitsubishi.	1959-1970s
Boeing CH-47 Chinook	1,179 +	United States	Built under licence by Kawasaki Heavy Industries and Elicotteri Meridionali (Agusta).	1962–present
Leonardo AW139	1,100+	Italy	Formerly AgustaWestland AW139	2001-
Eurocopter AS365 Dauphin	1,100+	France		1975–2022

== See also ==
- List of most-produced aircraft
- List of rotorcraft
