= Zamperini Field =

Airport in Torrance, California, US

Zamperini Field Lomita Landing Strip
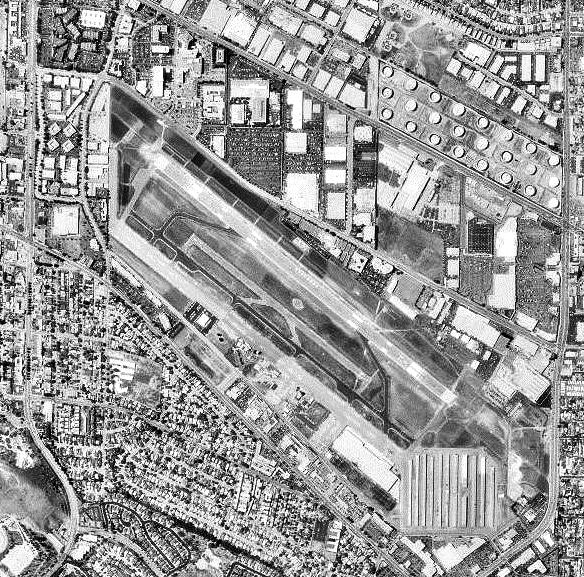
- 31 May 1994 USGS photo
- IATA: TOA; ICAO: KTOA; FAA LID: TOA

Summary
- Airport type: Public
- Owner: City of Torrance
- Location: Torrance, California
- Elevation AMSL: 103 ft (31 m)
- Coordinates: 33°48′12″N 118°20′23″W

Map
- Location within California Location within the United States

Runways
Direction	Length		Surface
Direction	ft	m	Surface
11L/29R	5,000	1,524	Asphalt/concrete
11R/29L	3,000	914	Asphalt/concrete

Helipads
Number	Length		Surface
Number	ft	m	Surface
HI	110	34	Asphalt

Statistics (2016)
- Aircraft operations: 119,034
- Based aircraft: 276
- Source: Federal Aviation Administration

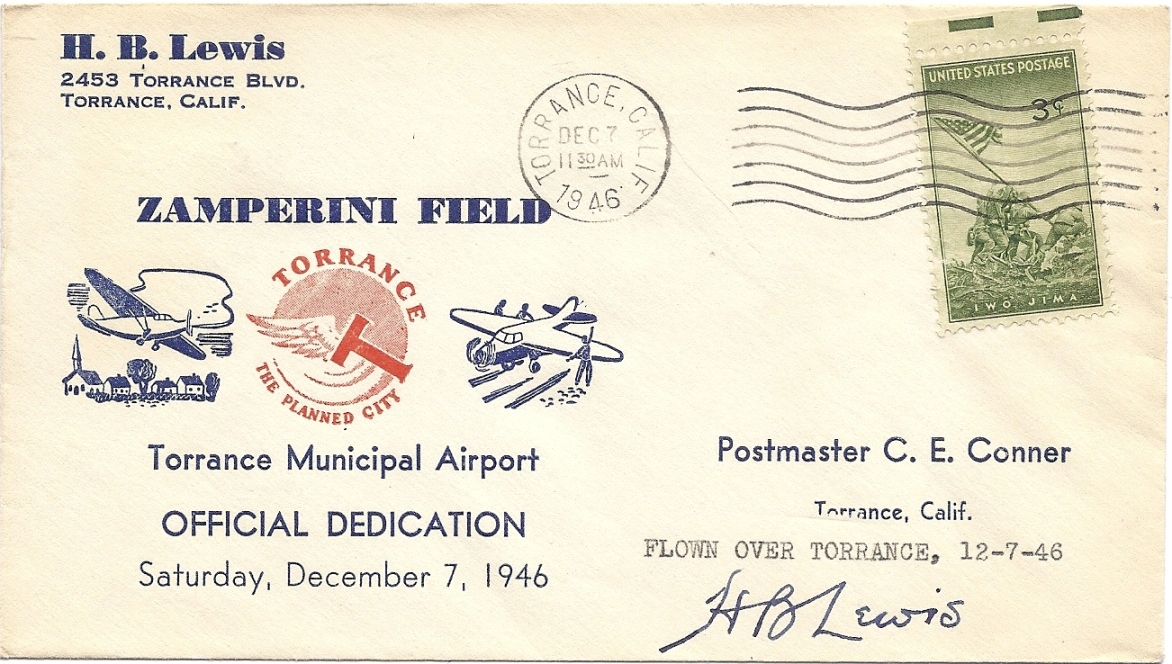
Uncataloged first day cover for the dedication of Zamperini Field, Torrance, CA. By Harry Burton Lewis, Public Relations / Operations Manager of Allied's Airports, Inc. and Ex. Sec. of Torrance Chamber of Commerce.

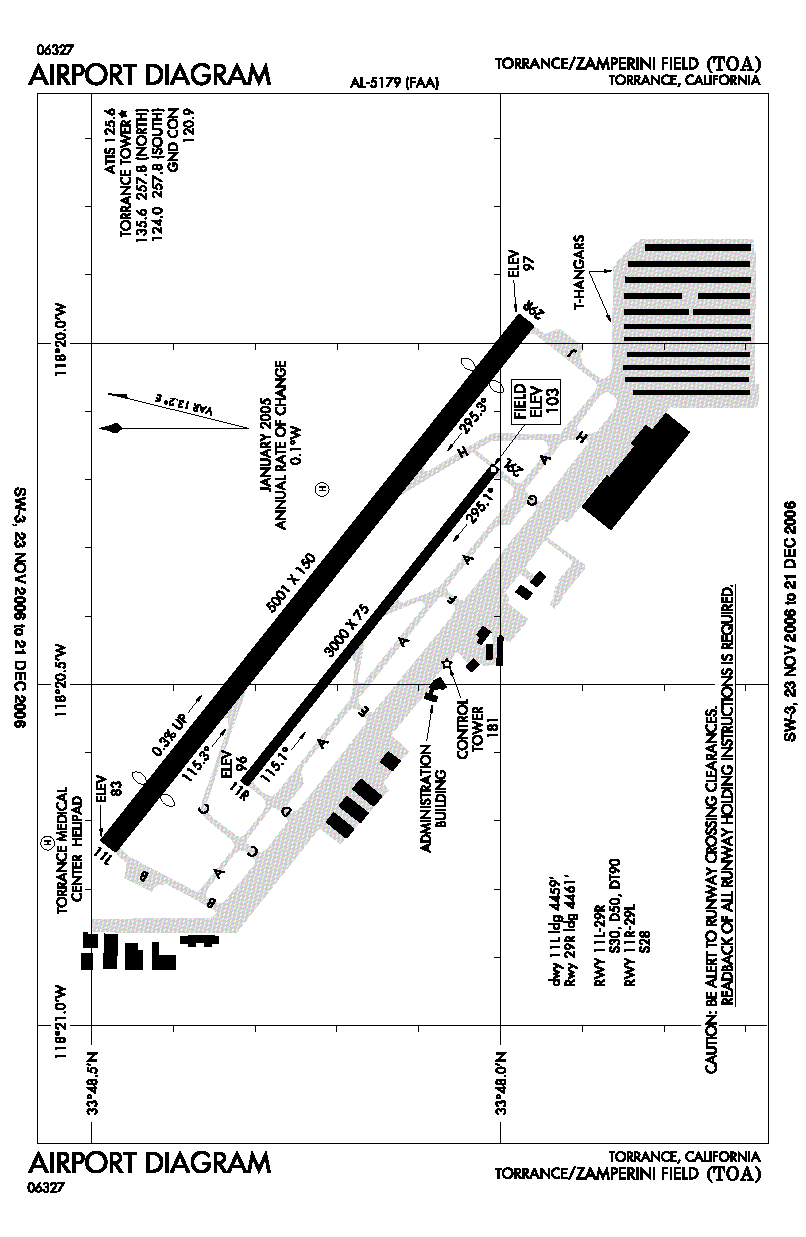
FAA diagram

Zamperini Field (IATA: TOA, ICAO: KTOA, FAA LID: TOA) is a public airport three miles (5 km) southwest of downtown Torrance, in Los Angeles County, California, United States.

The airport is classified by the FAA as a Regional Reliever and was once known as Torrance Municipal Airport; it was renamed for local sports and war hero Louis Zamperini on December 7, 1946, the fifth anniversary of the Pearl Harbor attack.

== History ==
The airport was completed by the United States Army Air Forces on March 31, 1943, and was known as Lomita Flight Strip. It was an emergency landing field for military aircraft on training flights. It was closed after World War II and the War Assets Administration (WAA) turned it over to local government. Once turned over to the City of Torrance it was renamed Zamperini Field on December 7, 1946.

== Facilities ==
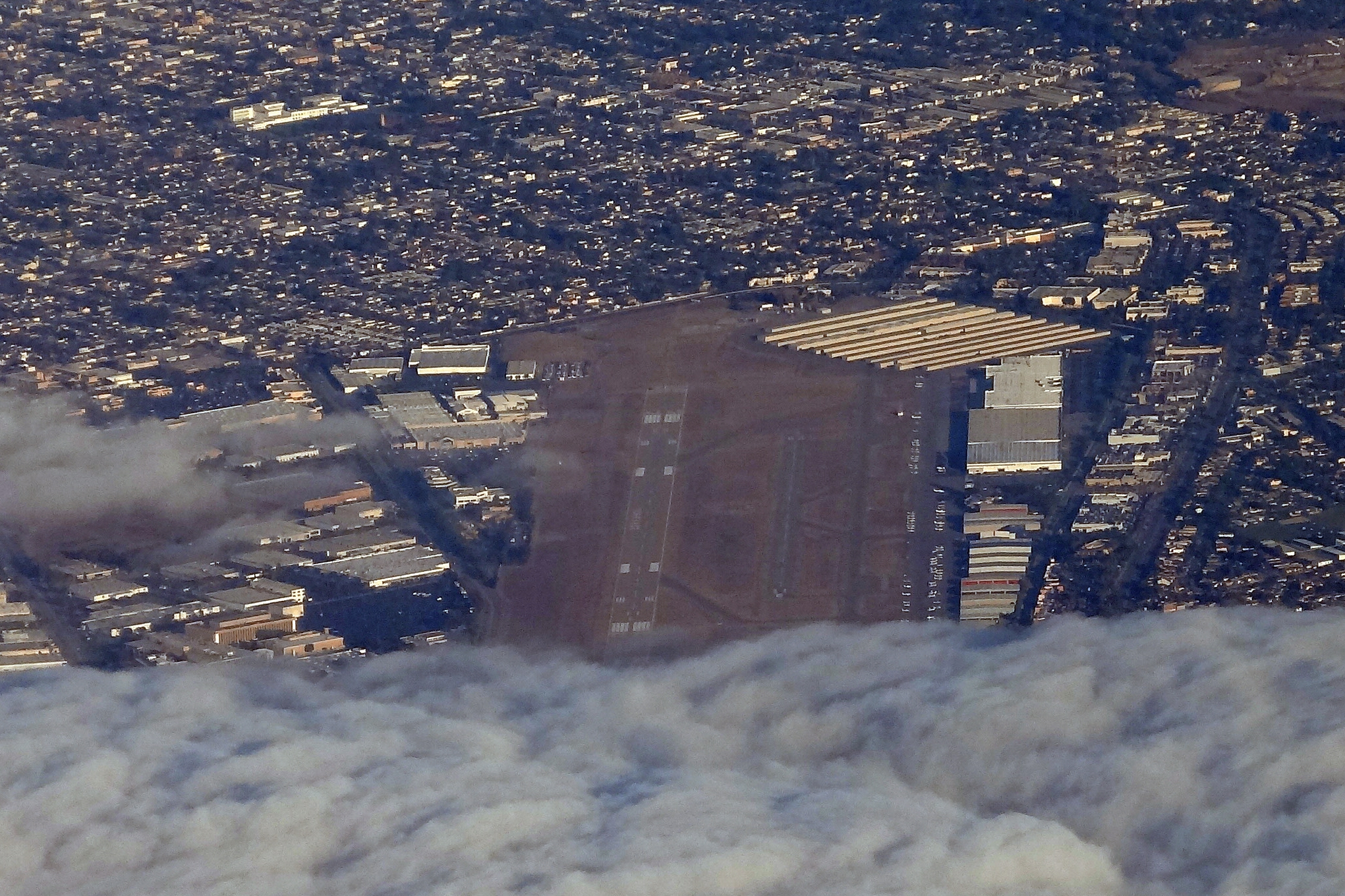
Zamperini Field

Zamperini Field covers 506 acres (205 ha) and has two asphalt/concrete runways: 11L/29R, 5,000 x 150 ft (1,524 x 46 m) and 11R/29L, 3,000 x 75 ft (914 x 23 m). It has one asphalt helipad, 110 x 110 ft (34 x 34 m).

In the year ending January 31, 2016, the airport had 119,034 aircraft operations, average 325 per day: 99% general aviation, <1% military and <1% air taxi. 276 aircraft are based at the airport: 89% single-engine, 9% multi-engine and 2% helicopter.

=== Terminal ===
Zamperini Field has a small terminal with a vending machine, conference room, bathroom, and flight planning room. Outside a patio has small tables. Inside the terminal are historical papers related to the airport on the wall and a security post. A Lockheed T-33 (#52-9239) is on display on the turn court outside the terminal.

=== Helicopter operations ===
The helipad for a neighboring hospital, the Torrance Memorial Medical Center, is at the north-west corner of the airfield.

=== Manufacturing ===
Zamperini Field is the home of Robinson Helicopter Company. Their entire production, assembly, and testing facilities are on the southeast side of the airfield and are the largest buildings at the field.

=== Museum ===
Zamperini Field is the new home of the Western Museum of Flight, previously in Hawthorne, California.

== Accidents and incidents ==
- A crash on April 9, 1982, killed three people in a Cessna 177 Cardinal. No bystanders were harmed. The single-engine passenger plane plunged from the sky shortly after takeoff and crashed in front of Farrell's in the middle of Hawthorne Boulevard, a major thoroughfare in Torrance. The nose-first impact created a fireball in the heavily trafficked street and shot flames over 100 feet into the air. Nearby parked cars were destroyed. Patrons of the restaurant referred to the scene as pandemonium.
- The Aeroméxico Flight 498 or Cerritos air disaster happened in 1986, when a private Piper Cherokee owned by William Kramer en route from Torrance to Big Bear City Airport near Big Bear Lake collided with a Douglas DC-9 owned by Aeroméxico en route from Mexico to Los Angeles International Airport. Both aircraft crashed, killing all on board and a few on the ground.
- January 19, 2019: An Aviat Pitts S-1T, N31WK, collided with an experimental Rutan VariEze, N27GM, while taxiing to parking at Zamperini Field Airport (TOA), Torrance, California. The owner/pilot of the Pitts was not injured; the airplane sustained minor damage. The owner/pilot of VariEze sustained minor injuries; the airplane was substantially damaged.
- September 19, 2019: A Cessna 177, N2323Y, airplane, was substantially damaged when it impacted a building about 3/4 mile east of the Zamperini Field Airport (TOA) Torrance, California. The commercial pilot was fatally injured, and the passenger was seriously injured.
- November 7, 2019: A Cirrus SR-22 departed from Zamperini Field in Torrance and had been in the air for about 19 minutes before it crashed. It had been heading to Cable Airport, a small independently owned airport less than two miles from the neighborhood where the plane went down, according to flight records. The pilot of a single-engine plane flying to a small airport in San Bernardino County was killed when his aircraft crashed into a home as it neared its destination, authorities said. Two people in the home were unharmed.
- February 19, 2021: A Piper PA-32-260 Cherokee Six, N57014, departed from Zamperini Field at 11:47AM and crashed into a semi-truck on Terminal Island in the Port of Los Angeles shortly before 12:30PM. The pilot was pronounced dead at the scene while the driver of the truck sustained serious injuries. The cause of the crash is still under investigation.
- April 10, 2026, a 2014 Solaris aviation sling 2 that took off from Zamperini field crashed, killing two.

== See also ==
- California World War II Army Airfields
