= Low-g condition =

Phase of aerodynamic flight

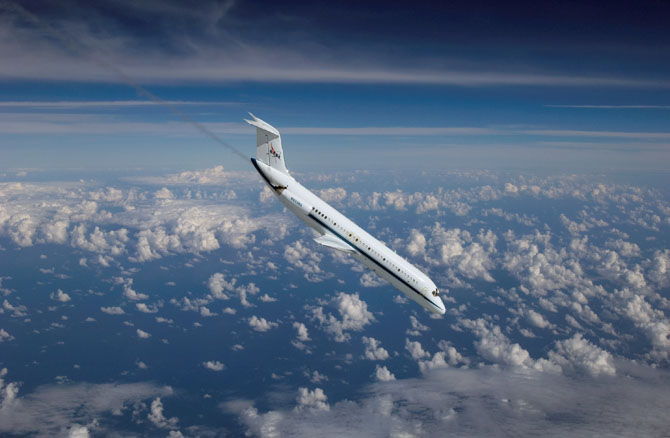
An airplane experiencing low-g conditions

Low-g condition is a phase of aerodynamic flight where the airframe is temporarily unloaded. The pilot and the airframe feel temporarily "weightless" because the aircraft is in free-fall or decelerating vertically at the top of a climb. It may also occur during an excessively rapid entry into autorotation. This can have a disastrous effect on the aircraft, particularly in the case of helicopters, some of which need the rotor to constantly be under a non-zero amount of load.

Low-g conditions are forbidden for teetering rotor helicopters, because the design cannot control its attitude independently and can also be dangerous for other types. The U.S. Army discovered the danger of Low-g conditions in the 1960s when they were losing helicopters to mysterious accidents that did not have a clear cause.

Low-g conditions is a term related to flight, and related terms are zero g conditions and negative g. Low-g conditions can cause an environment where mast bumping in helicopters may occur.

== Effects ==
=== Helicopters ===
In contrast, low-g conditions can be disastrous for helicopters. In such a situation, their rotors may flap beyond normal limits and cause the root of the blades to exceed the limit of their hinges. This condition, known as mast bumping, can cause the separation of the blades from the hub or shearing of the mast and hence detach the whole system from the aircraft. This is especially true for helicopters with teetering rotors, such as the two-blade design seen on Robinson helicopters. This effect was first discovered when many accidents with Bell UH-1 and AH-1 helicopters occurred. These particular helicopters simply crashed without any obvious cause. Later, it was found that these accidents usually happened during low terrain flight after passing a ridge and initiating a dive from the previous climb. Articulated and rigid rotor systems do not lose controlling forces up to 0 g, but may encounter this depending on their flapping hinge offset from the mast.

Dangerous situations can occur in helicopters in low-g conditions, especially those with teetering rotor designs. In the late 1960s, the US Army discovered the danger of a main rotor striking a helicopter's own tail in certain aerodynamic conditions, particularly low-g conditions. During low-g conditions, the weight of the helicopter is unloaded from the main rotor, and inputs to the controls can create a dangerous situation.

Helicopters with teetering rotors must not be subjected to a low-g condition, because such rotor systems do not control the fuselage attitude. This can result in the fuselage assuming an attitude controlled by momentum and tail rotor thrust, leading the tail boom to intersect the main rotor tip-path plane or the blade roots contacting the main rotor drive shaft, which may cause the blades to separate from the hub (mast bumping). In the 2020s, Robinson developed a new tail empennage for the R66 to reduce the chance of this type of accident. Two university studies of the Robinson main rotor, one by Georgia Tech and the other by the University of Maryland, did not find the rotor design to be more susceptible in low-g conditions than other teetering designs, fitting with Robinson's ongoing study of its design. Nevertheless, Robinson developed a new empennage to increase high speed roll stability, which was approved by the FAA in 2023. Robinson hopes to bring this redesign to its other models, although low-g maneuvers remain forbidden in Robinson designs even for demonstrations.

An example of accident attributed to low-g conditions happened in Australia in 2020, when a R44 entered low-g conditions while flying through valleys. This led to extreme teetering and an ensuing break-up of the aircraft.

=== Fixed-wing aircraft ===
Low-g conditions can also affect fixed-wing aircraft in some instances, mainly by disrupting the airflow over the wings, making them difficult or impossible to control via the aerodynamic surfaces.

The controllability of an airplane by the control surfaces only depends on airspeed. So, if one keeps airspeed, control is retained. Usually the controllability is increased, because there is no need to produce lift. 0 g forces are a minimal problem for fixed wing aircraft, but there are exceptions, including, but not limited to, airplanes with gravity-fed fuel systems.

== Use in space agencies ==
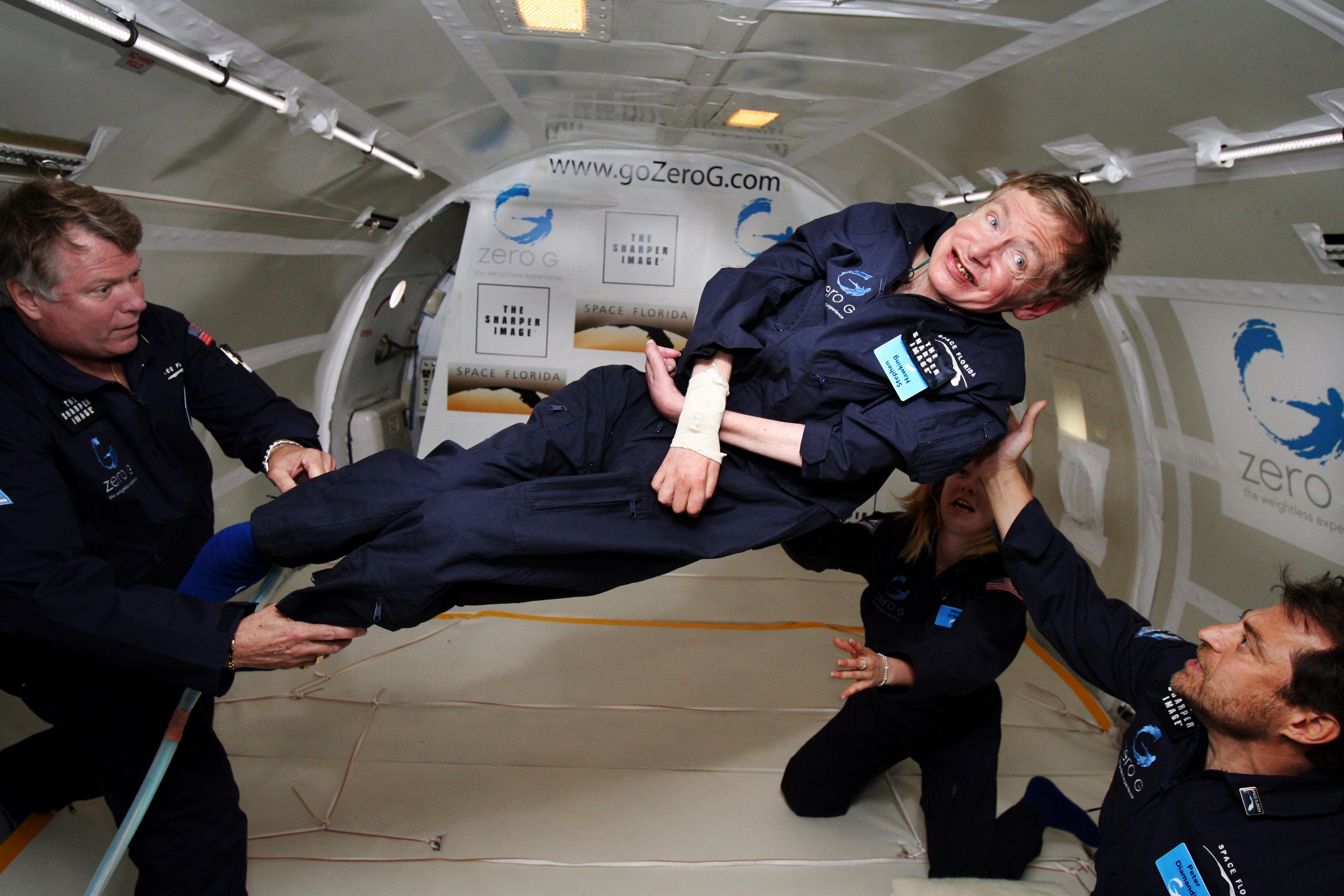
Stephen Hawking experiencing weightlessness on an aircraft designed to simulate low gravity

To simulate 0-g conditions some space agencies uses a modified passenger aircraft to simulate a low-g condition. The ESA uses an Airbus A300, for example. NASA has the Vomit Comet.
