= Airways Flying Club =

Airways Flying Club (Airways Aero Associations Ltd)
- Type: Limited company
- Industry: Flying training
- Founded: January 1, 1948
- Headquarters: Wycombe Air Park, Booker, Buckinghamshire, England, United Kingdom
- Services: Gift Flights, JAR PPL, NPPL, Night Rating, IMC
- Owner: Arora Family Trust
- Website: Archived 2012-04-21 at the Wayback Machine

The Airways flying club was formed in 1948 under the name of the Airways Aero Club, by employees of British European Airways (BEA) and British Overseas Airways Corporation (BOAC). The club is operated by Airways Aero Associations Ltd, and flies out of Wycombe Air Park.

== History ==
The flying club was established in 1948 by three predecessor airlines of British Airways; British Overseas Airways Corporation (BOAC), British European Airways (BEA) and British South American Airways (BSAA) as a means to provide private flying at an affordable rate for corporation staff. Originally the club flew from Denham, Hurn and Whitchurch, operating a fleet of Miles Magisters.

During the early part of the 1950s the parent Corporation's withdrew from Whitchurch and Hurn, and as Denham was too small for the club the flying base was transferred to Croydon Airport. As the decade continued the club operated pilot, navigator and engineer training programmes for BOAC, BEA, the Air Ministry and Lufthansa, and helped to set up the National Flying Training School at Bremen as well as Baghdad and Kuwait Flying Schools.

With the closure of Croydon Airport, the club moved again, first to White Waltham Airfield before moving to its present home at Wycombe Air Park in 1965. It operated Chipmunks, including G-AOZU and G-AOZV out of Biggin Hill in 1960.

While under the ownership of BEA and BOAC's successor British Airways, the club was known as the British Airways Flying Club. In November 2007 the airline sold the club to the Arora Family Trust, and it was renamed the Airways Flying Club, operated by Airways Aero Associations Limited.

The club was merged with the company operating Wycombe Air Park in January 2012 to form Booker Aviation, a trading name of Airways Aero Associations Limited.

== Operations ==
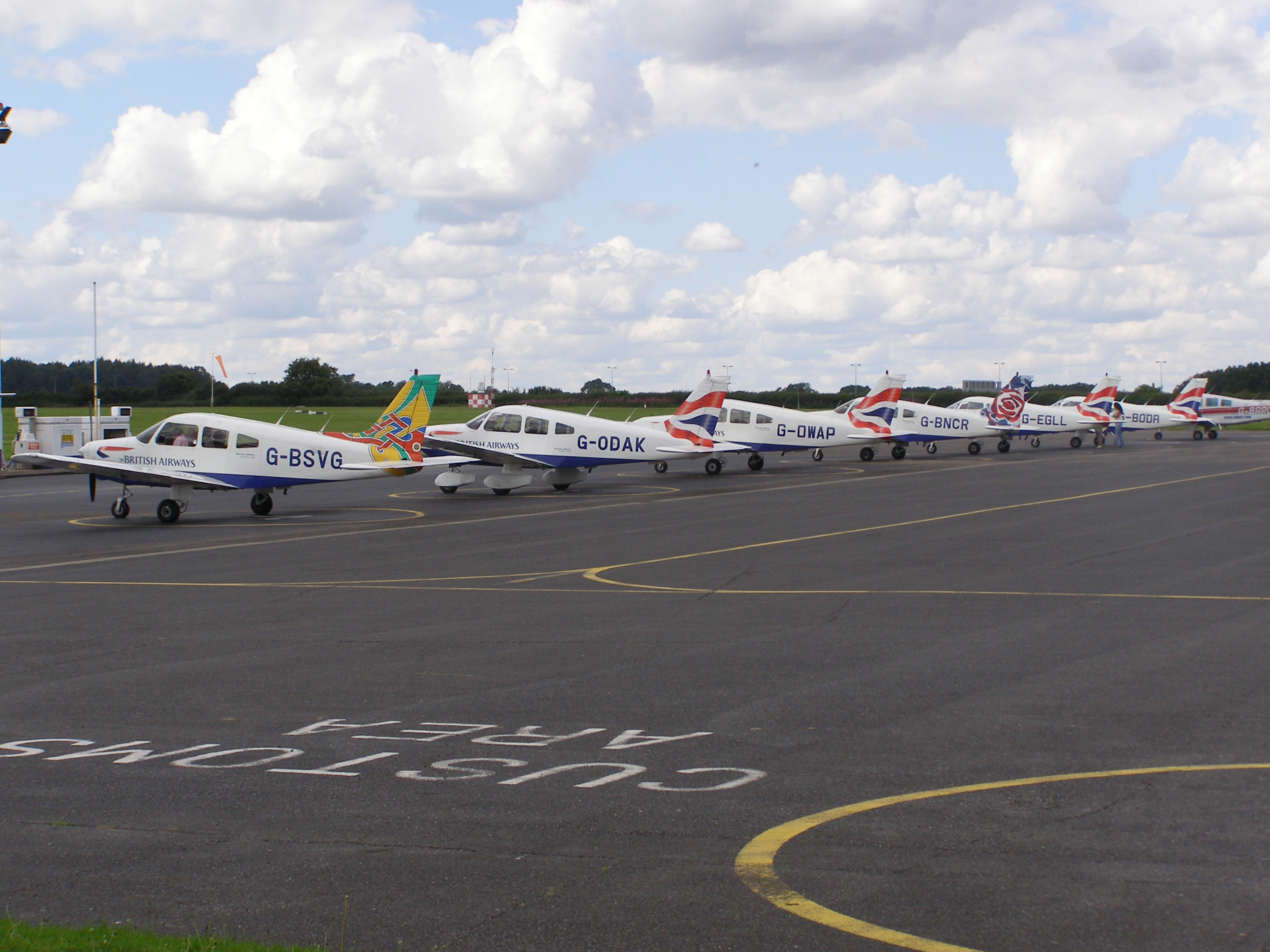
Piper Dakota aircraft at Wycombe Air Park

The Airways Flying Club operates from Wycombe Air Park, with a fleet of Piper Warrior, Piper Dakota, de Havilland Chipmunk and Cessna 152 aircraft. The flying club acquired the long term lease to the airfield in 1965, following the closure of RAF Booker, previously on the site. Surinder Arora, the hotel entrepreneur, purchased the lease to the airfield along with the flying club in 2007.
