= Centrair =

Centrair may refer to:

- Chubu Centrair International Airport, Japan
- SA Centrair, a former French glider manufacturer
