= Chiltern Park Aerodrome =

Airfield in Woodcote, Oxfordshire, England

- The aerodrome viewed from the north in 2008
- IATA: none; ICAO: none

Summary
- Airport type: Private
- Owner: Chiltern Aerosports
- Location: Woodcote, Oxfordshire
- Opened: 1988
- Closed: 24 September 2021
- Elevation AMSL: 180 ft / 55 m
- Coordinates: 51°33′10″N 001°06′02″W
- Website: www.chiltern.aero

Map
- Location in Oxfordshire

Runways
Direction	Length		Surface
Direction	m	ft	Surface
04R/22L	550	1,804	Grass
04L/22R	700	2,297	Grass
15/33	420	1,378	Grass

Chiltern Park Aerodrome was a private airfield near Ipsden in Oxfordshire.

The airfield was established in 1988, and it catered for general aviation and was home to parachuting and gliding clubs before its closure in 2021.

== History ==
G-FROM, an Ikarus C42, at the aerodrome in 2011

The aerodrome was established in 1988, and catered for general aviation, including gyroplanes, microlights, helicopters, and gliders. It was within RAF Benson's Military Aerodrome Traffic Zone.

It had three grass runways: the parallel 04L/22R and 04R/22L (700 metres (2,300 ft) and 520 metres (1,710 ft)), and 15/33 (420 metres (1,380 ft).

In 2011 the aerodrome became the home of the London Parachute School, which used the airfield for tandem jumps. In 2020, the Booker Gliding Club moved to Chiltern while Wycombe Air Park was closed.

In June 2021 the landowner ended the lease of the airfield and ordered it be closed, citing its growth over its 33-year operation as well as noise pollution affecting local residents. It closed on 24 September, and the aerodrome was reverted to farmland.
