= Robinson R44 =

Family of American light helicopters

R44
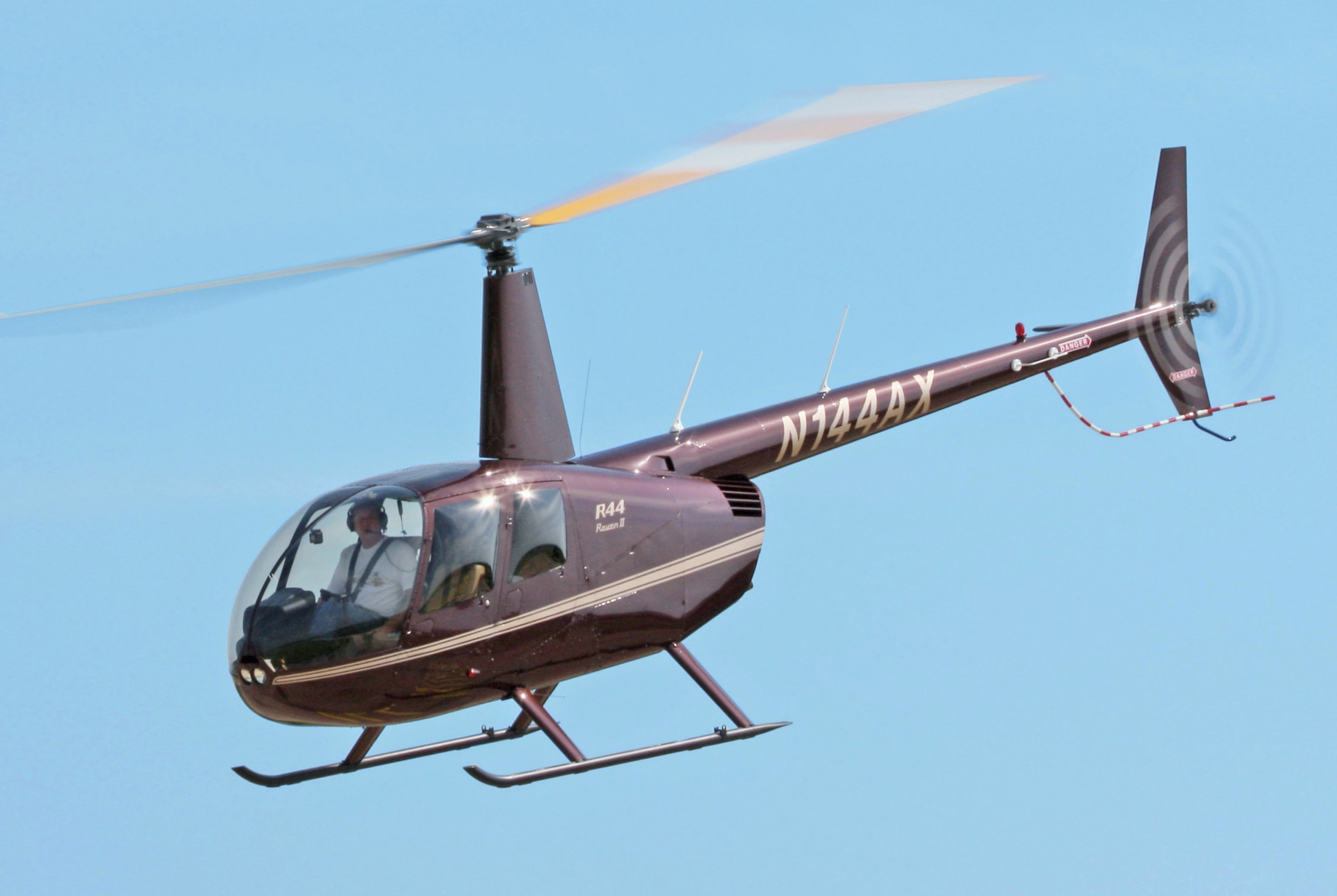

General information
- Type: Light utility and trainer helicopter
- Manufacturer: Robinson Helicopter Company
- Designer: Frank D. Robinson
- Status: In production
- Number built: 6,866+ (through 2023)

History
- Manufactured: 1990–present
- Introduction date: 1993
- First flight: 31 March 1990
- Developed from: Robinson R22
- Developed into: Robinson R66

The Robinson R44 is a four-seat light helicopter produced by Robinson Helicopter Company since 1992. Derived from the company's two-seat Robinson R22, the R44 features hydraulically assisted flight controls and a larger engine. It was first flown on 31 March 1990 and received FAA certification in December 1992, with the first delivery in February 1993.

The R44 has been the world's best-selling general aviation (GA) helicopter every year since 1999. It is one of the most-produced GA aircraft of the 21st century, with 5,941 deliveries from 2001 to 2020.

== Design ==
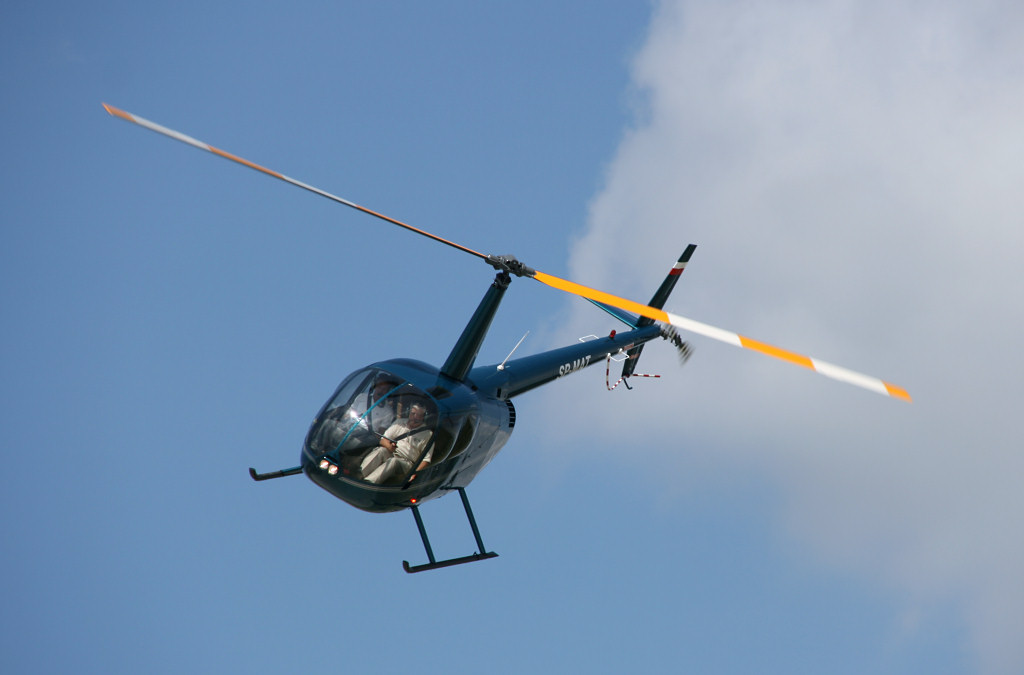
Robinson R44 Raven II at an air show, 2007

The R44 is a single-engined helicopter with a semi-rigid two-bladed main rotor, a two-bladed tail rotor and a skid landing gear. It has an enclosed cabin with two rows of side-by-side seating for a pilot and three passengers. Tail rotor direction of rotation on the R44 is reversed compared to the R22 for improved yaw control authority. On the R44 the advancing blade is on the bottom.

== Development ==
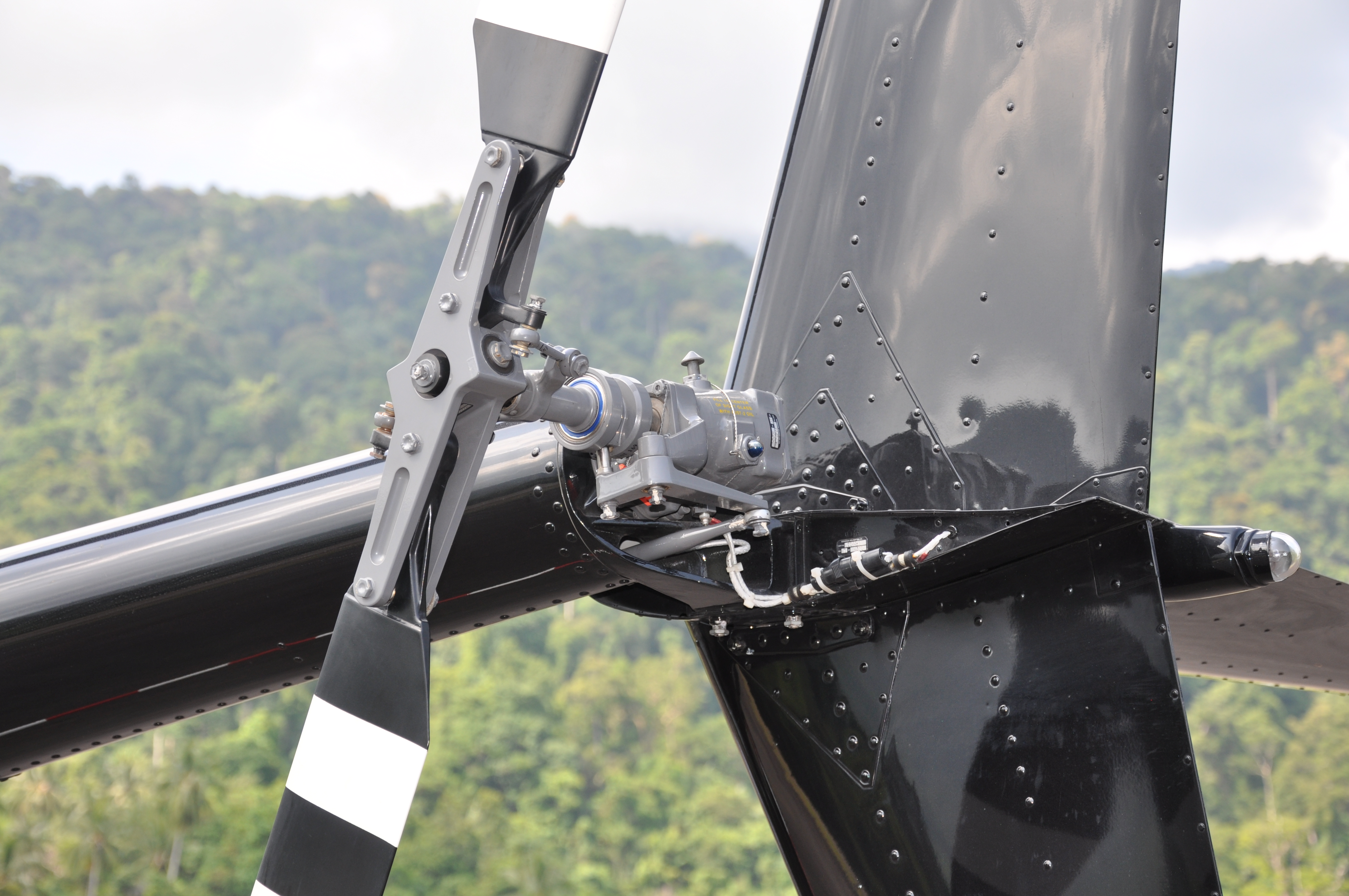
Closeup of the R44 tailrotor

Designed during the 1980s by Frank Robinson and his staff of engineers, the R44 first flew on 31 March 1990. The R44 Astro was awarded an FAA Type Certificate in December 1992, with the first deliveries taking place in January 1993. The first R44 Newscopter featuring onboard electronic news gathering equipment was delivered in 1998. In January 2000, Robinson introduced the Raven with hydraulically assisted controls and adjustable pedals. In July 2002, Robinson introduced the Raven II featuring a more powerful, fuel-injected engine and wider blades, allowing a higher gross weight and improved altitude performance.

During November 2015 Robinson announced the Cadet, a Raven I with a cargo area instead of the two back seats, a slightly less powerful engine and a more efficient muffler.

Robinson has carried out ground run testing with an aircraft diesel engine that could replace its Lycoming IO-540 avgas engine. The diesel could provide better altitude performance, a fuel burn reduced from 16 to 12 US gal (61 to 45 L) per hour and better fuel availability with no lead pollution.

In 2023, the R550X, an unmanned helicopter drone based on the R44 Raven II was developed by Rotor Technologies.

== Ground handling ==
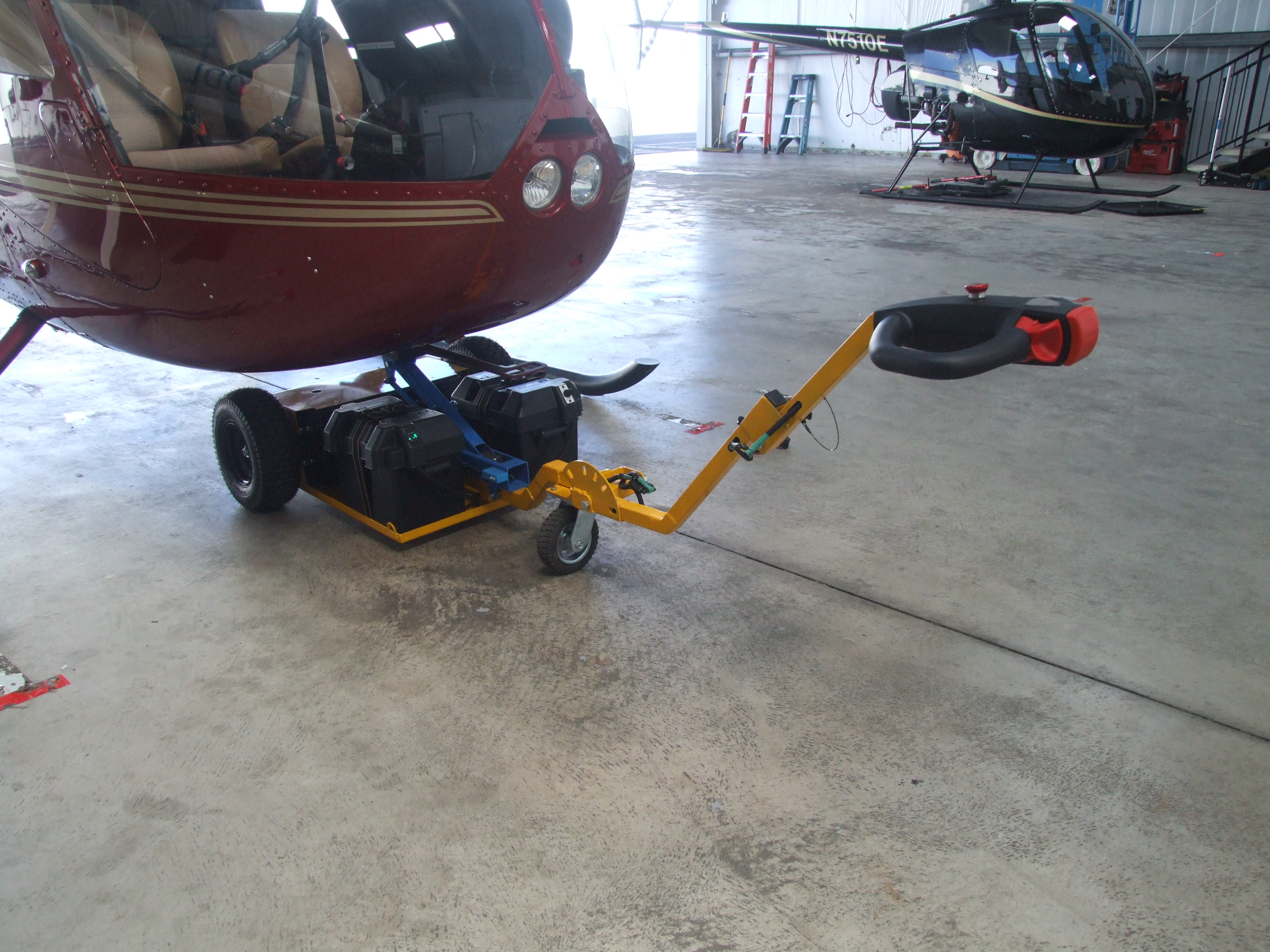
Robinson Helicopter tow cart connected to R44

R44s are equipped with wheel mounts toward the rear of the skids, one on each side, for attachment of removable wheels. The wheels must be removed prior to flight. These brackets are slightly behind the helicopter center of gravity so when the wheels are installed, the helicopter sits nose low. The wheel assembly has a pivot pin which is inserted into the skid-mounted bracket and then rotated over center to lift the rear of the skids about 2 inches leaving the front of the skids on the ground. The helicopter can be moved by pulling down on the tail to lift the front of the skids off the ground. Because of the size and weight of the R44 and the height of the tail from the ground, as compared to the R22, it is extremely difficult if not impossible for a single person to move the helicopter this way. Another person can help by pushing on the bracing behind the engine.

R44s with fixed floats or deployed pop-out emergency floats must have wheels installed under the skids as the bracket is not accessible.

All models and years of the R44 include a 3/4-inch-diameter tow ball mounted on the bottom of the fuselage, near the front and offset slightly to the left. A tow cart or tug can be engaged with the ball and then used to lift the front of the helicopter to clear the skids from the ground after the wheels are installed and rotated to lift the rear of the skids. This makes it possible for a single person to move the helicopter, even over significant distances or not-level surfaces.

Tow carts are available with a variety of features. There exist manual versions which place the ball mating device behind the wheels so the operator engages the ball then pushes down on the handle to lift the nose. Others provide a repurposed car-style hydraulic jack or an electric jack to lift the nose.

Tow carts are available with no motive power, a gas engine or one or two electric motors operated from one or two batteries. Some of the non-powered tow carts are set up to be towed such as behind a golf cart or quad cycle. One manufacturer offered a modified pallet jack.

The other option for ground handling is a landing platform which is large enough for the helicopter to safely land on, has wheels underneath and can be towed between the hangar and take-off location. These are heavy and must be towed with a vehicle. Platforms are commonly used with R44s.

== Operational history ==
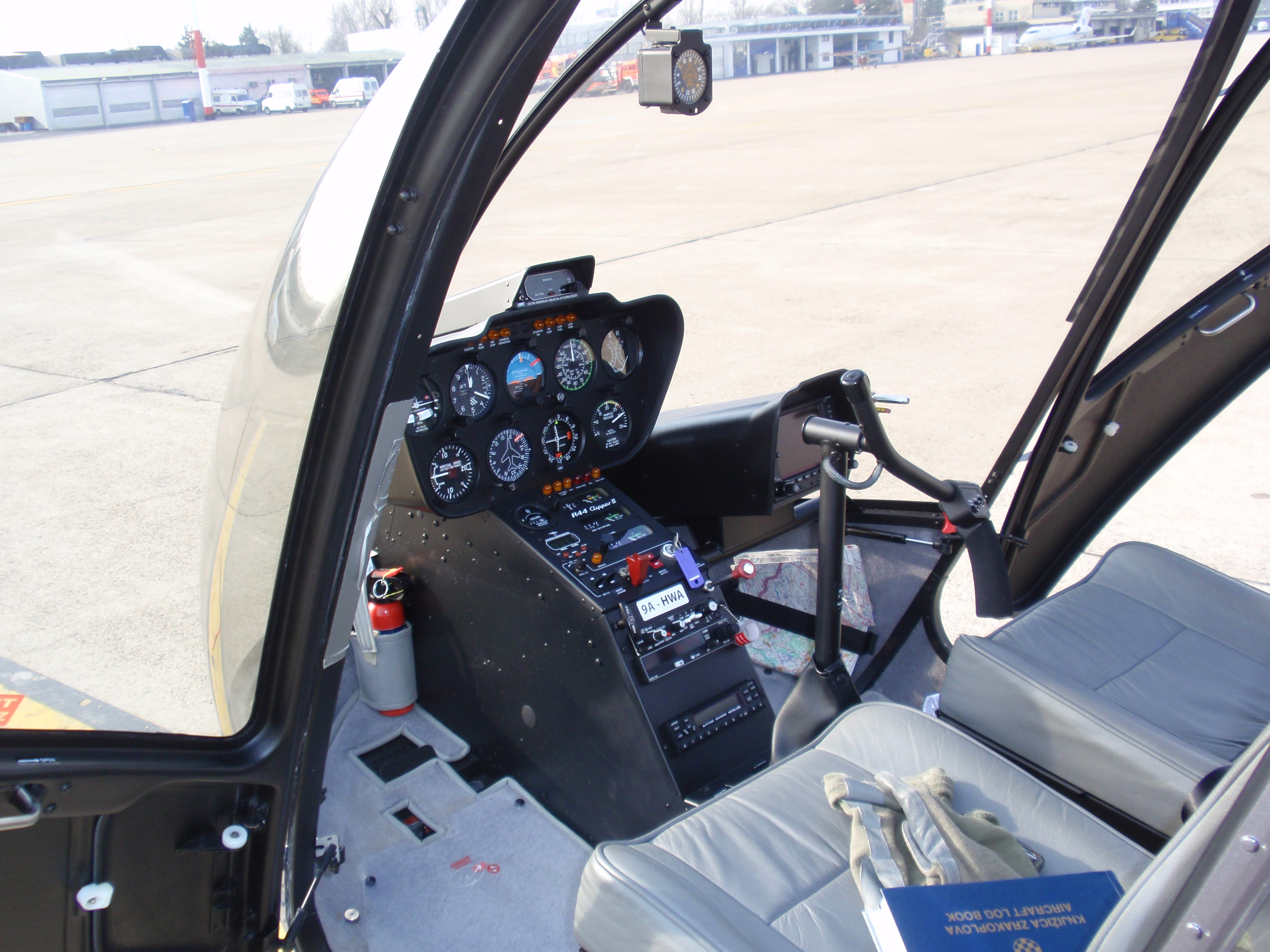
R44 cockpit

In 1997, a Robinson R44 was piloted by Jennifer Murray for the first helicopter circumnavigation of the world by a woman, covering a distance of 36,000 miles in 97 days. As of 2014, an R44 holds the piston speed record of 123 knots (228 km/h; 142 mph).

== Operators ==
=== Civilian operators ===
The aircraft is operated by many private individuals, companies and flying clubs. It is also a popular choice for law enforcement agencies.

==== Flight schools ====
R-44 Raven and Cadet models are also widely used for flight training in the US, because of their simplicity and functionality. Collegiate flight programs such as Southern Utah University, Embry Riddle, and University of North Dakota utilize these aircraft for training students in their Rotor Wing programs.

=== Military and government operators ===
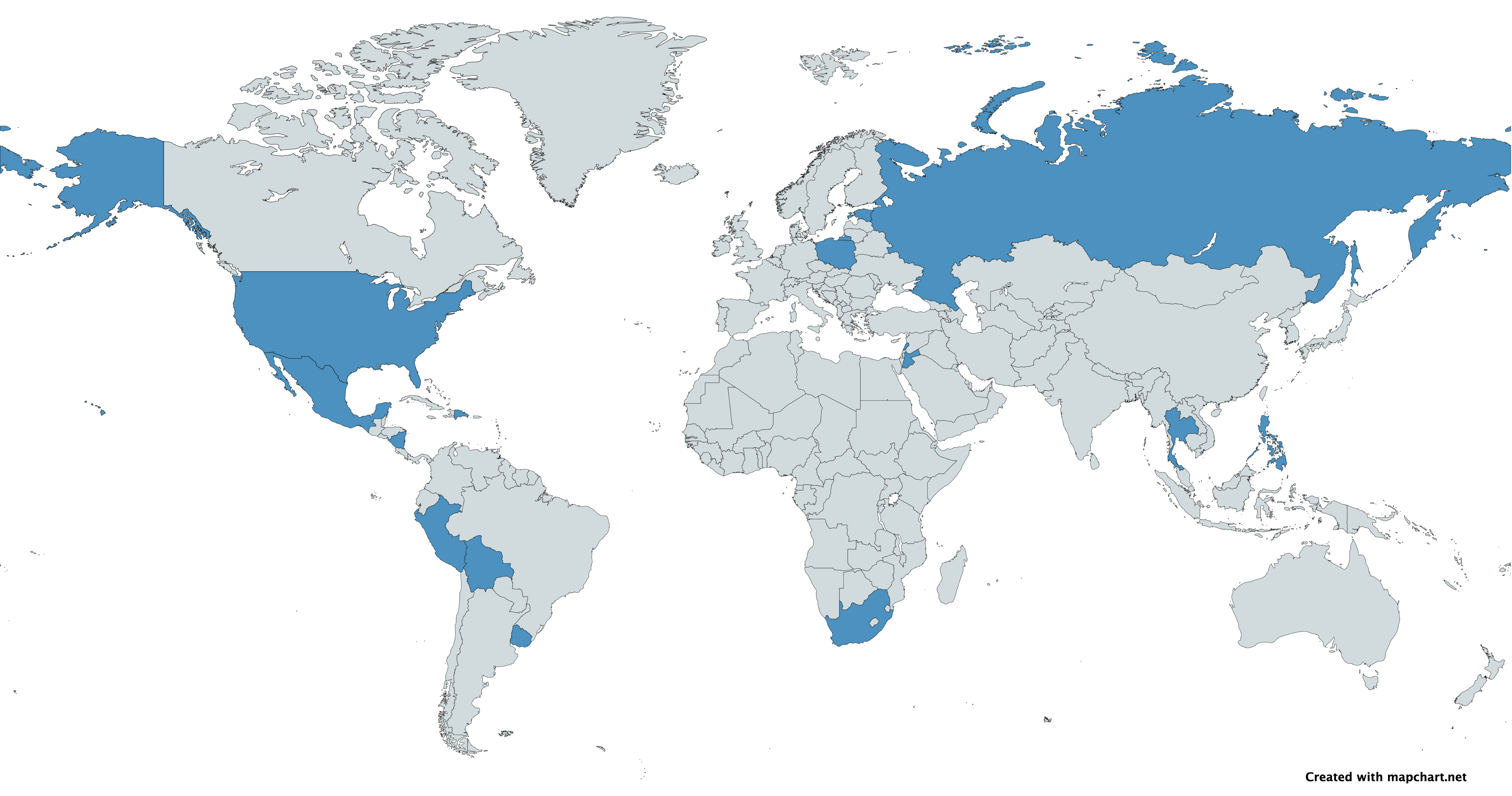
Map with Robinson R44 government operators in blue

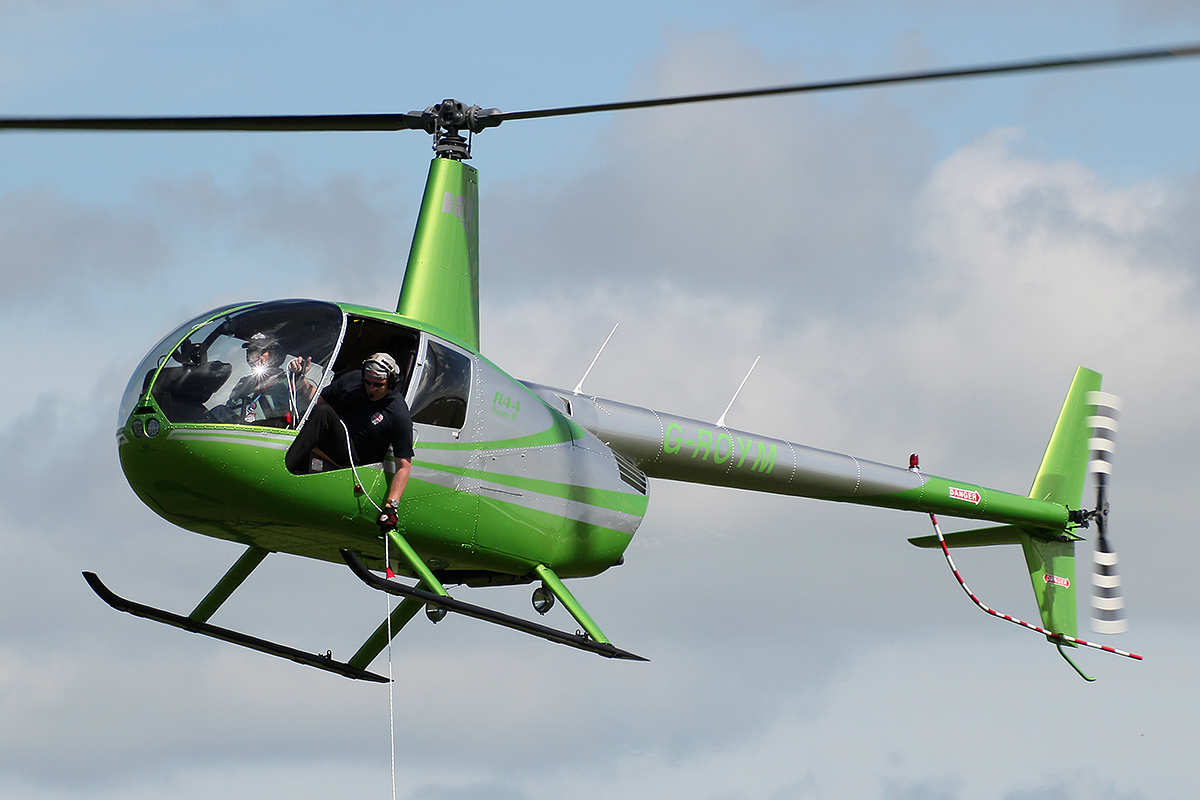
A Robinson R44 in a hover

Bolivia

- Bolivian Air Force

Dominican Republic

- Dominican Republic Army

Jordan

- Royal Jordanian Air Force

Lebanon

- Lebanese Air Force

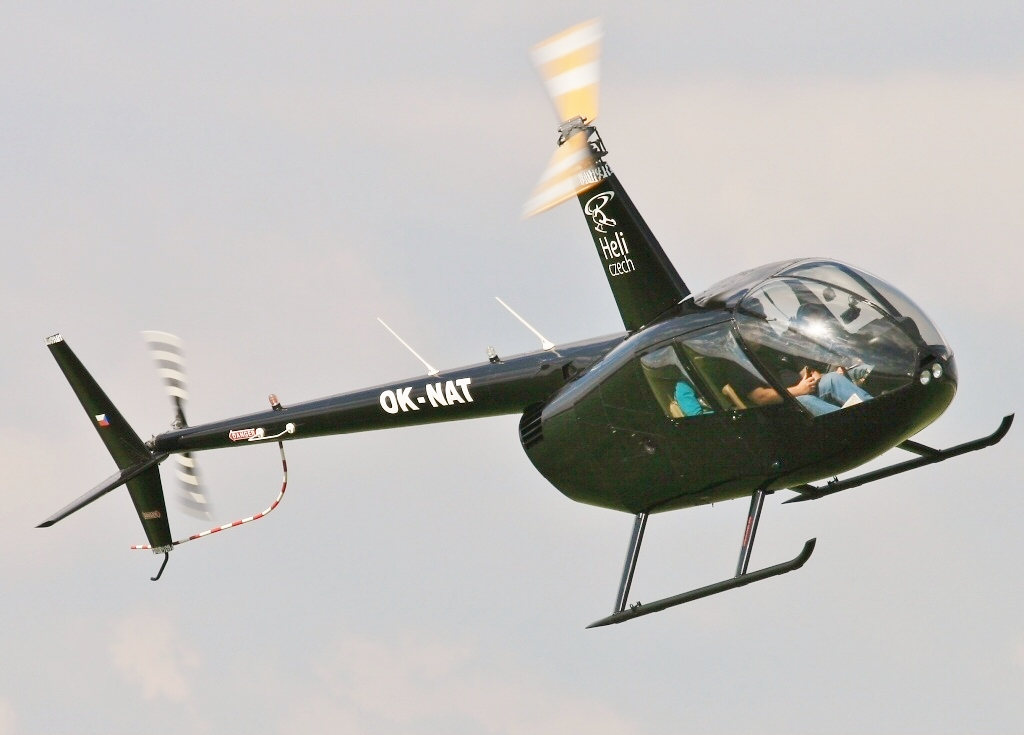
An R44 from the Czech Republic

Mexico

- Mexican Navy

Nicaragua

- Nicaraguan Air Force

Peru

- Peruvian Army

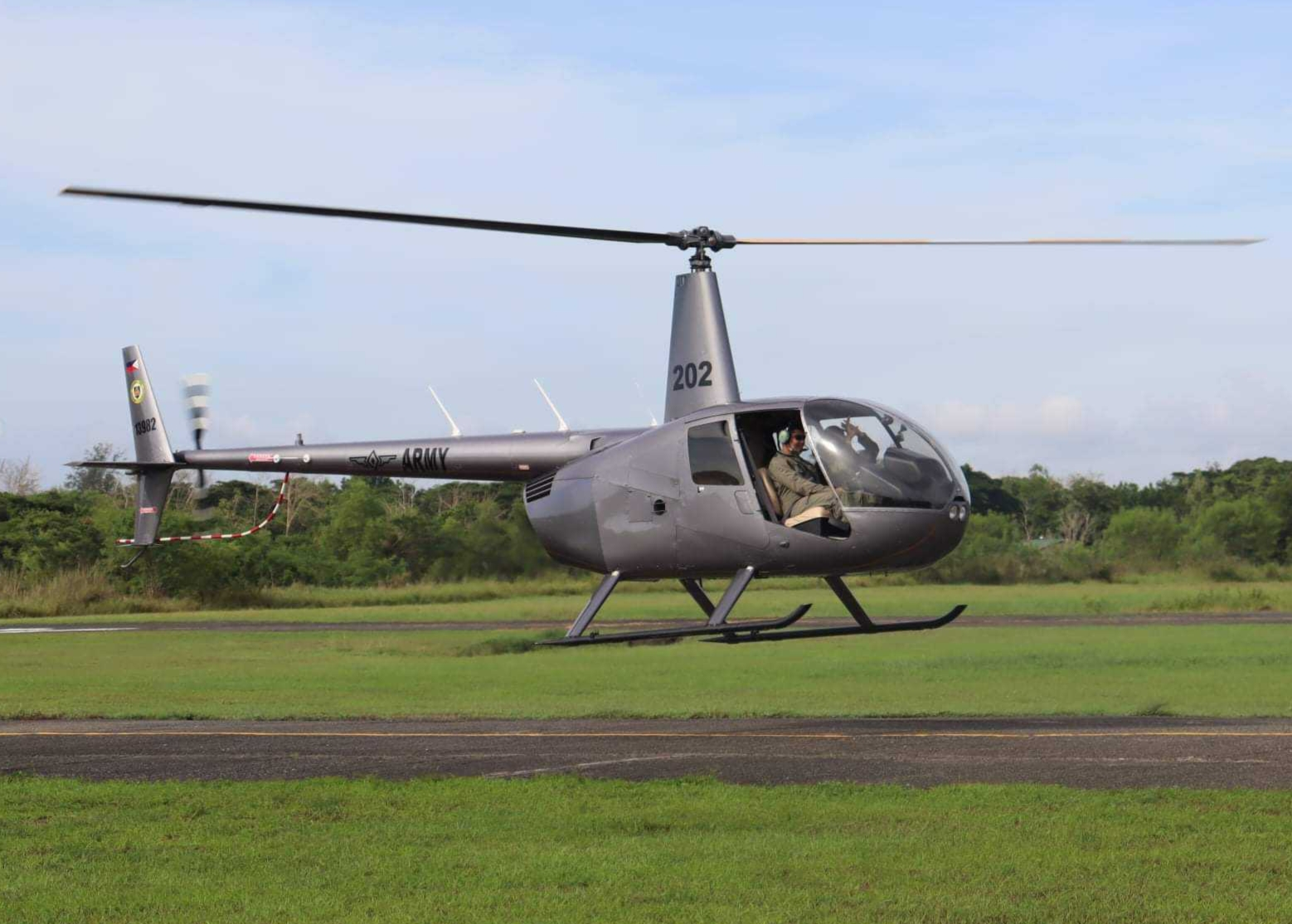
Philippine Army R44

Philippines

- Philippine Army- 2 Units
- Philippine National Police- 4 Units
- Philippine Navy- 3 Units as part of Php298.1 million ($5.8 million) grant under the Foreign Military Financing (FMF) program.

Poland

- Air ambulances in Poland (crew training purpose)

Russia

- Forest Protection Service

South Africa

- South African Police Service Air Wing

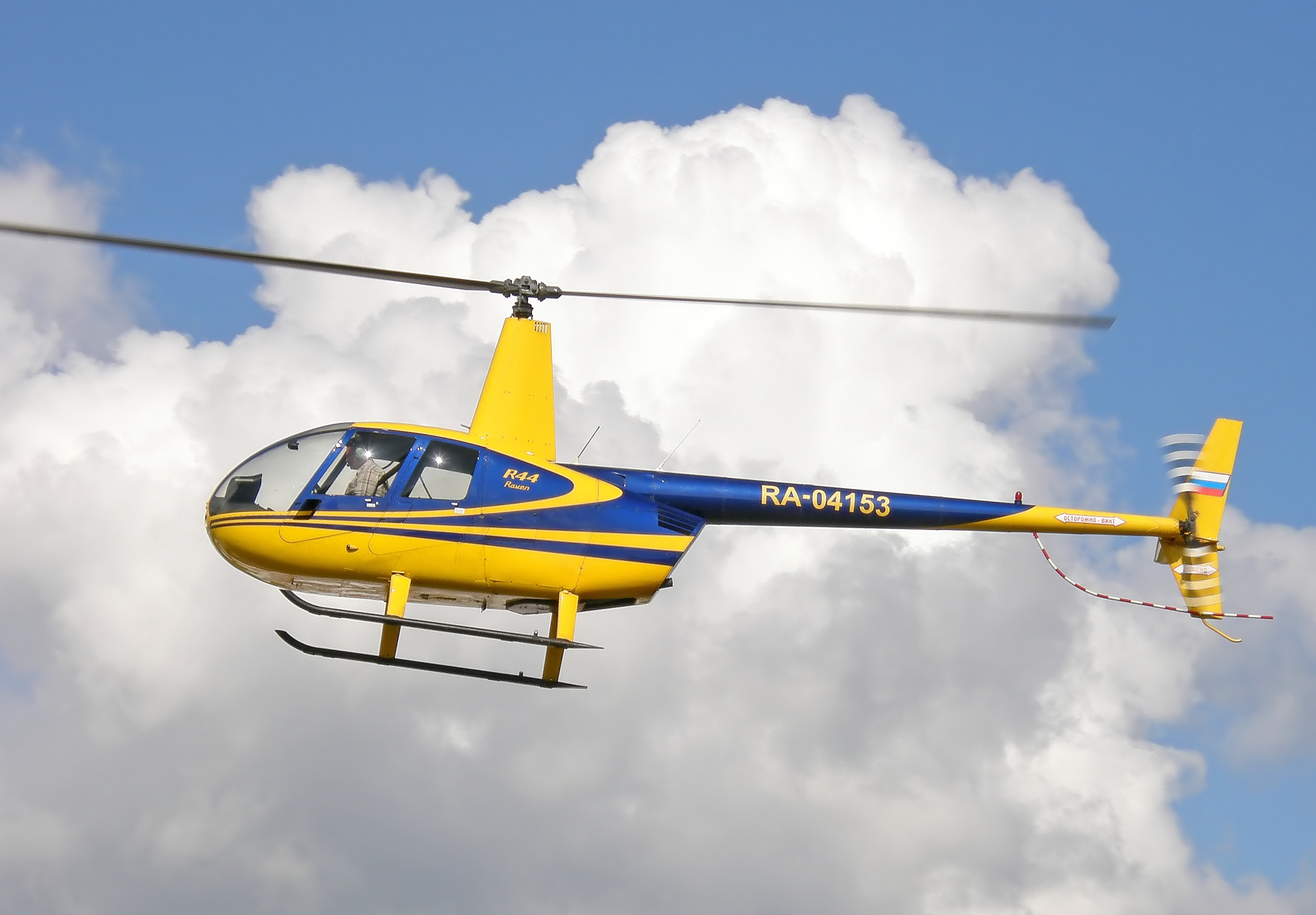
An R44 in flight over Russia

Thailand

- Royal Thai Army

United States

- Alaska State Troopers

Uruguay

- Police of Uruguay

== Accidents and incidents ==
- On 6 February 2024 an R44 crashed into Ranco Lake near Lago Ranco, Los Ríos Region in Chile. Three of the four occupants survived, the fatality being ex-President of Chile Sebastián Piñera who was also the pilot of the helicopter.
- On 25 August 2025 an R44 helicopter crashed during a flying lesson in a field near Ventnor on the Isle of Wight, England. The aircraft departed from Sandown Airport at approximately 9:00 AM, with four individuals on board (the pilot and three passengers). Three people were killed in the crash, while one survivor was seriously injured and airlifted to the Major Trauma Centre at University Hospital Southampton.
- On 30 October 2025 an R44 helicopter crashed into a field in the village of Bentley in Doncaster, South Yorkshire. The cause of the crash and number of injuries are as of yet unknown.
- On 29 November 2025 an R44 II (F-HEAT) helicopter crashed into a forest near village of Cierpisz in Poland. Two people were killed.
- On 22 June 2026, a Robinson R44 training helicopter crashed in Sincan, Ankara, Turkey, killing the pilot and injuring the co-pilot.

=== Fuel tanks ===
The R44 was found to be prone to post-accident fires due to damage to the aluminum fuel tanks, allowing fuel to leak out. In 2009, the company began installing bladder-type fuel tanks in all new R44 helicopters. It also issued Service Bulletin SB-78 on 20 December 2010, requiring R44 helicopters with all-aluminum fuel tanks to be retrofitted with bladder-type tanks to "improve the R44's fuel system's resistance to a post-accident fuel leak." The company recommended that the change should be done as soon as practical, but no later than 31 December 2014. The compliance date was later moved to 30 April 2013.

An accident investigation by the Australian Transport Safety Bureau (ATSB) in March 2013 found, after analyzing historical data, that a significantly higher proportion of R44 aircraft (12%) caught fire after crashing, compared to accidents involving other types of piston-engine helicopters (7%). Preliminary analysis by the ATSB of the NTSB's accident database found a similar statistic, with 15% of accidents in the US involving R44 helicopters having post-crash fires.

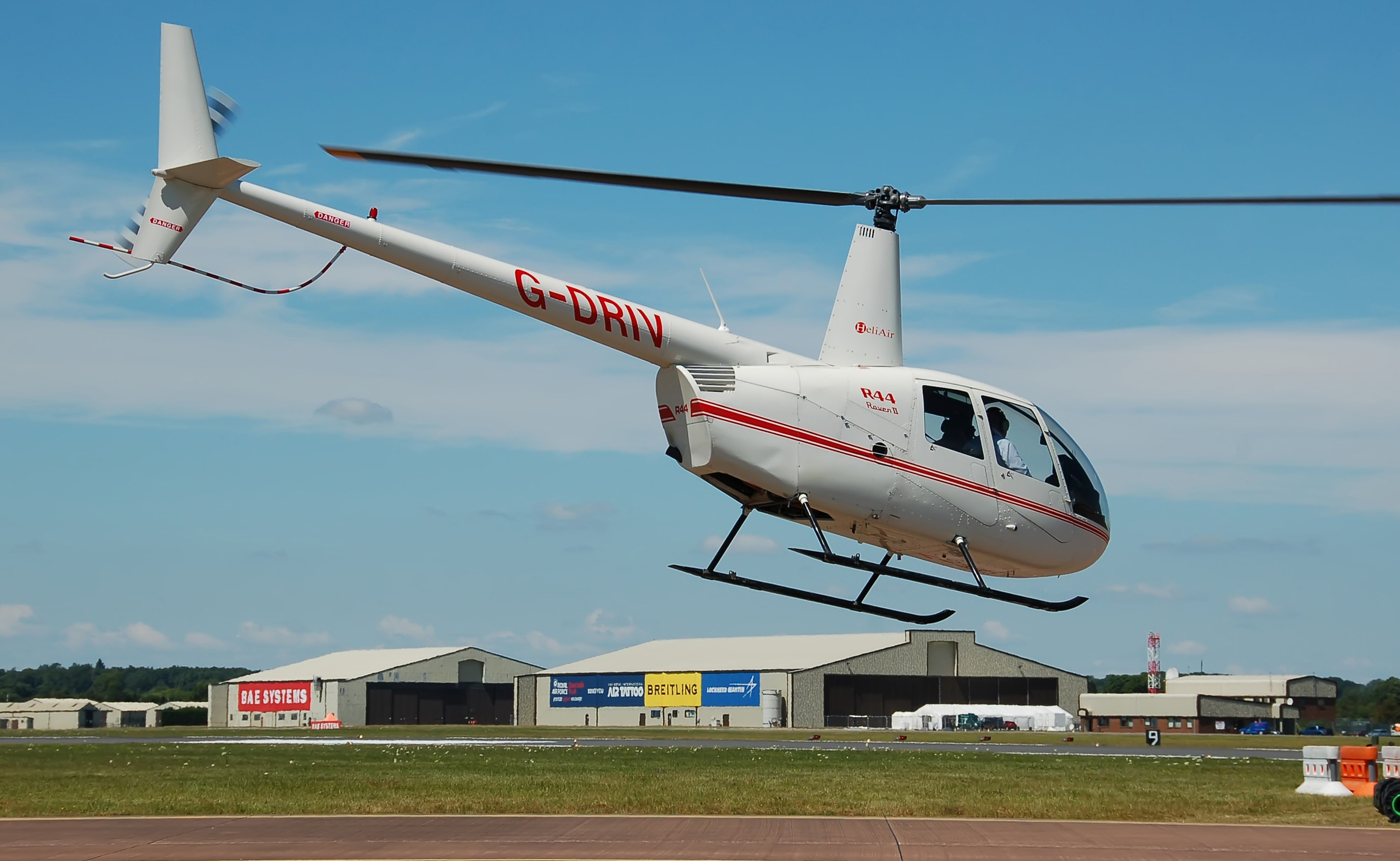
Heli Air Robinson R44 Raven II arriving for the 2014 Royal International Air Tattoo, England

Although the data did not consider which type of fuel tanks were fitted, the report mentioned four fatal accidents to the R44 fitted with bladder-type tanks, but as far as they knew, did not involve a post-accident fire. The ATSB recommended that the Australian Civil Aviation Safety Authority (CASA) take further action to urge R44 owners to fit bladder-type tanks. The FAA, the governing body in the country of manufacture whose directives would normally be followed in other countries like Australia, had not mandated the retrofit; CASA therefore issued Australian-specific airworthiness directive AD/R44/23, grounding R44 aircraft on 30 April 2013 that had not yet been upgraded.

=== Rotor failures ===
On 19 February 2015, the New Zealand Civil Aviation Authority issued an Airworthiness Directive grounding 80 of the country's R44 helicopters after two people were killed in an accident traced to a particular type of main rotor blade, the P/N C016-7 or Dash 7, which a preliminary investigation determined had failed in flight. It was the second failure or partial failure in two months. This was the largest-scale grounding of any aircraft in New Zealand's history. The CAA determined through laboratory tests that the rotor blade had failed due to overload during the crash and was not the cause of the accident and the fleet was ungrounded on 24 February 2015. The CAA left the Airworthiness Directive requiring repetitive inspections in place, however. Director of Civil Aviation Graeme Harris stated, "We don't want to see any complacency amongst operators as there is still a concern with these blades and we are waiting on test results from the USA before we review the Airworthiness notice." Following the grounding in New Zealand, Australia's Civil Aviation Safety Authority (CASA) also grounded R44 helicopters with the same rotor blades.

== Specifications (R44 Raven II) ==
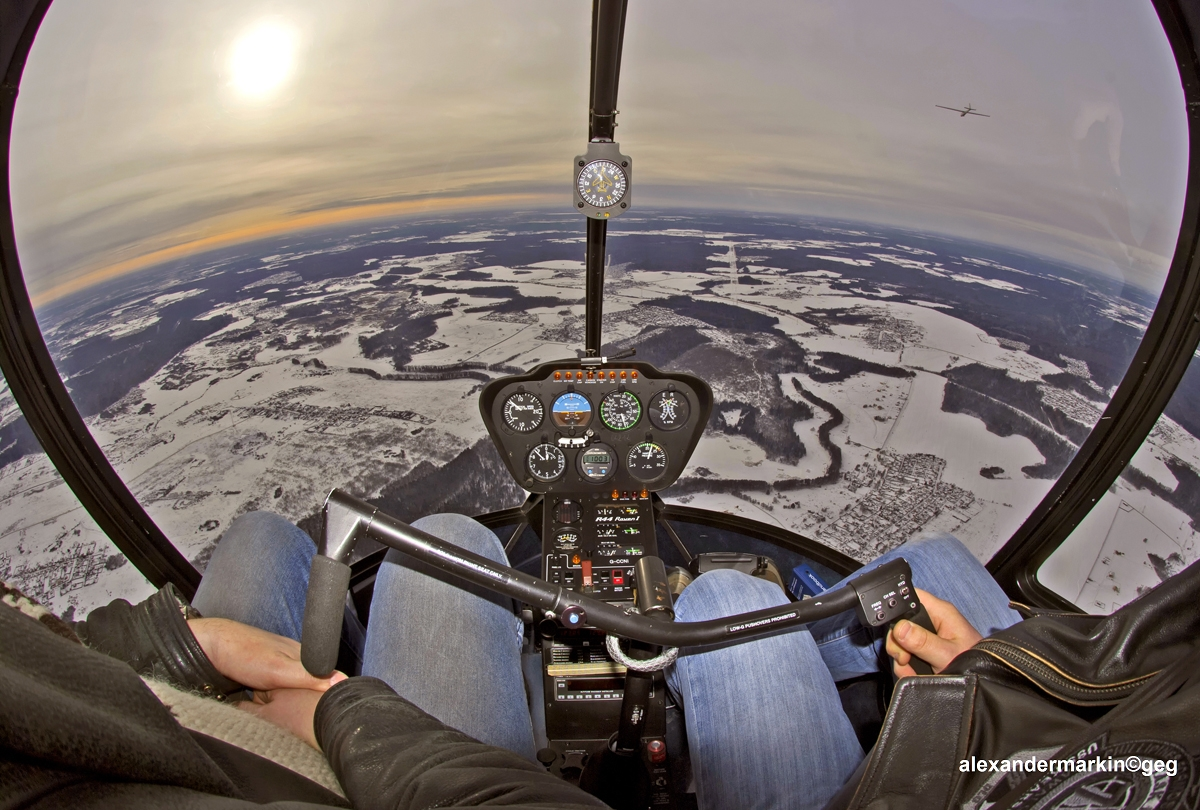
View from cockpit in-flight

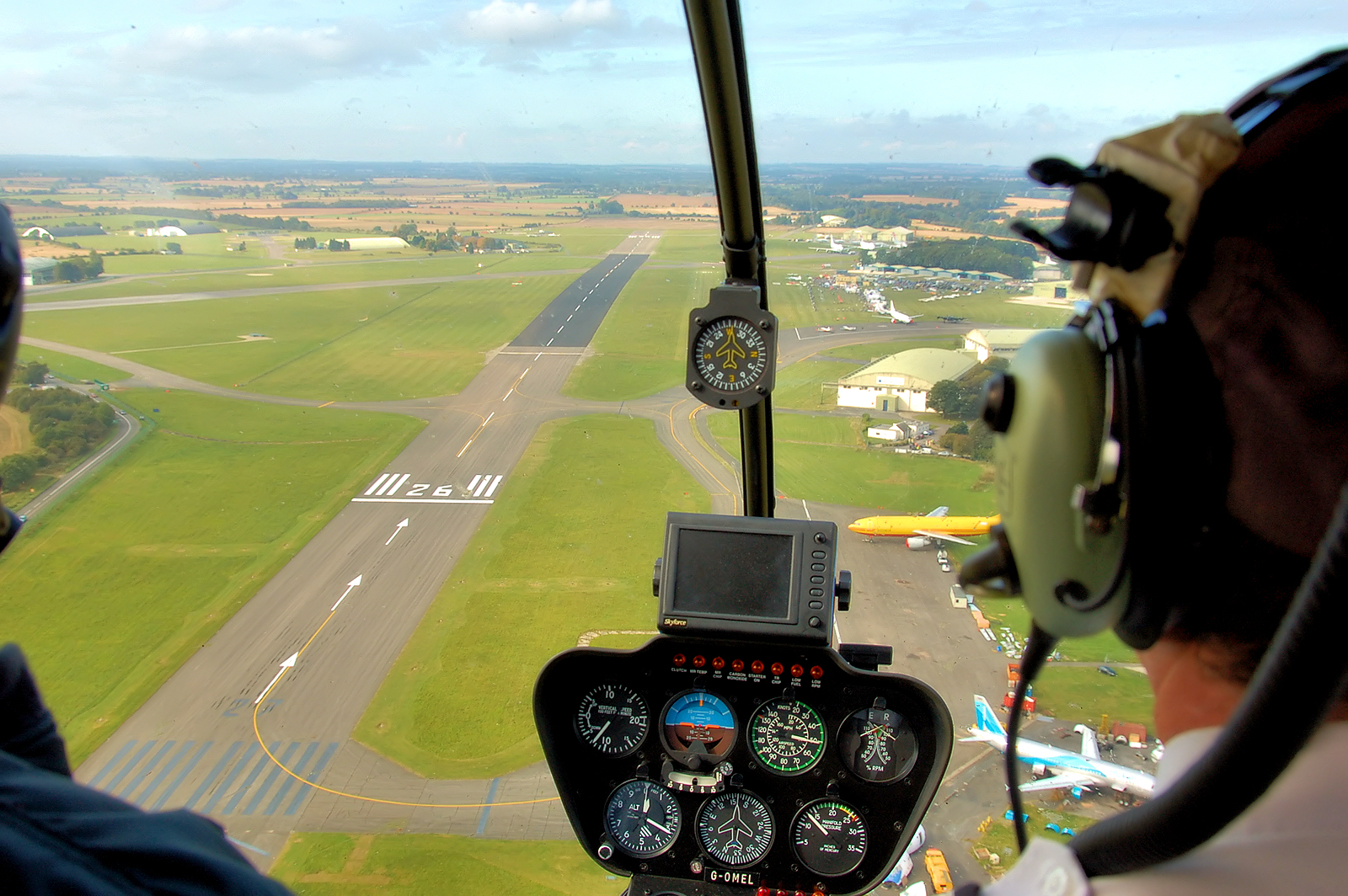
Landing at Gloucestershire, England

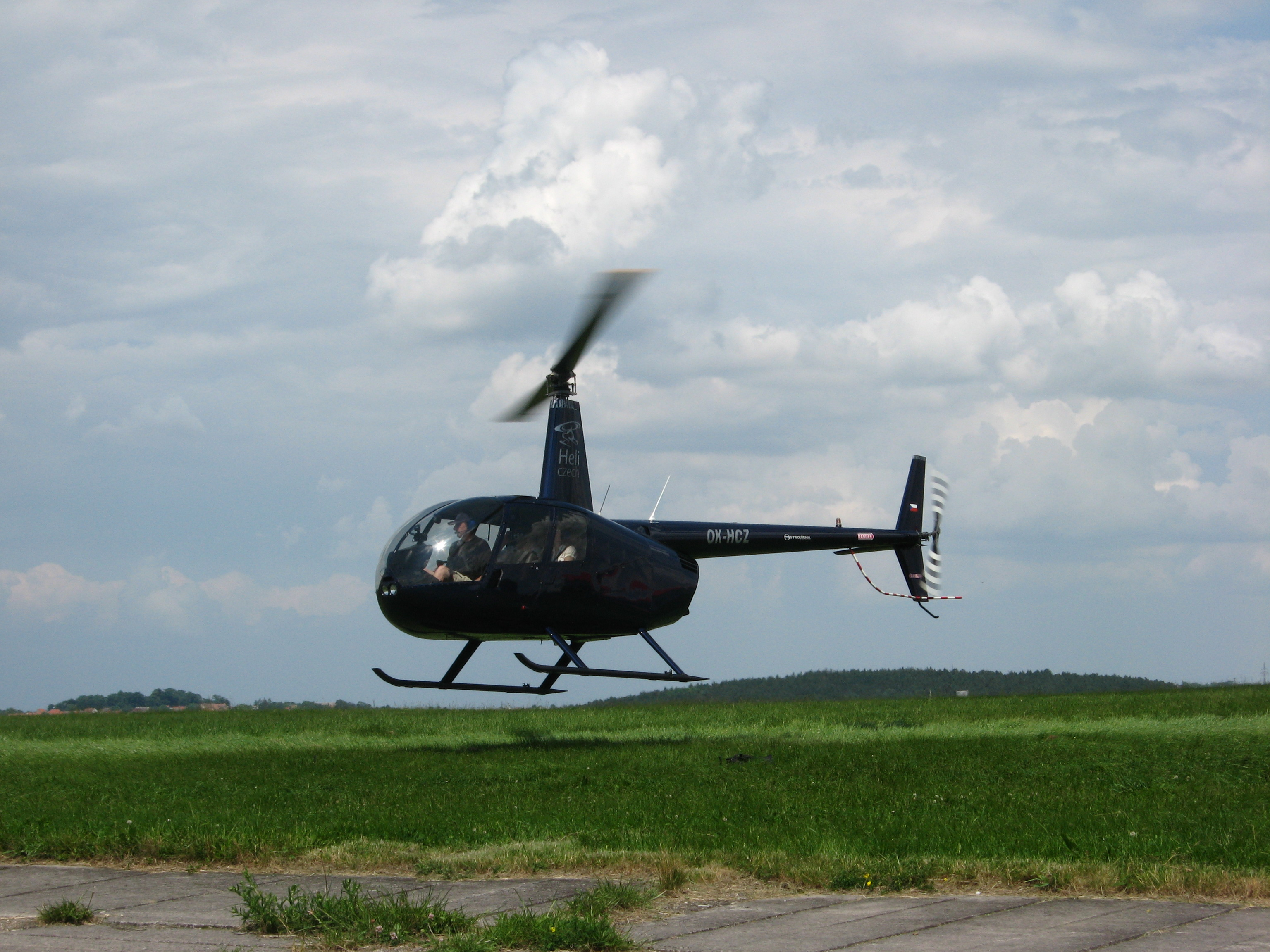
R44 in a hover

Data from Robinson R44 Raven II Pilot's Operating Handbook and FAA approved rotorcraft flight manual, dated 13 June 2005, and new Robinson R44 Raven II specifications.

General characteristics

- Crew: 1/2 (There are 4 seats including the pilot, so there can be pilot and co-pilot, with two passengers, or alternately a single pilot with 3 passenger spots)
- Capacity: 3/2 / 748 lb (339 kg)
- Length: 38 ft 3 in (11.66 m)
- Height: 10 ft 9 in (3.28 m)
- Airfoil: NACA 63-015
- Empty weight: 1,505 lb (683 kg)
- Gross weight: 2,500 lb (1,134 kg)
- Fuel capacity: Fuel: 100 octane low lead (100LL) fuel or 100/130 octane

- Main tank capacity: 31.6 US gal (26 imp gal; 120 L)
- Main tank usable fuel: 30.6 US gal (25 imp gal; 116 L)
- Auxiliary tank capacity: 18.5 US gal (15 imp gal; 70 L)
- Auxiliary tank usable fuel: 18.3 US gal (15 imp gal; 69 L)

- Powerplant: 1 × Lycoming IO-540-AE1A5 6-cylinder air-cooled horizontally-opposed piston engine, 245 hp (183 kW)
- Main rotor diameter: 33 ft (10 m)
- Main rotor area: 855.4 sq ft (79.47 m^{2})

Performance

- Maximum speed: 130 kn (150 mph, 240 km/h)
- Cruise speed: 109 kn (125 mph, 202 km/h)
- Range: 300 nmi (350 mi, 560 km) no reserve
- Fuel consumption: 15 gallons per hour (12 imp gal/h; 57 L/h)
- Altitude restrictions: 14,000 ft (4,300 m) density altitude or 9,000 ft (2,700 m) above ground level in order to be able to reach ground within 5 minutes in case of fire

== See also ==
Related development

- Robinson R22
- Robinson R66

Aircraft of comparable role, configuration, and era

- Bell 206
- Enstrom F-28
- MD Helicopters MD 500

Related lists

- List of civil aircraft
- List of rotorcraft
- List of most-produced rotorcraft
