= C101 =

C101 may refer to:

- CASA C-101, a low-wing single engine jet-powered advanced trainer and light attack aircraft
- C-101, a supersonic anti-ship missile that can be launched from air, ship and shore
- Centrair C101 Pegase
- C-101 Vega
