= Wycombe Air Park =

Wycombe Air Park/Booker Airfield
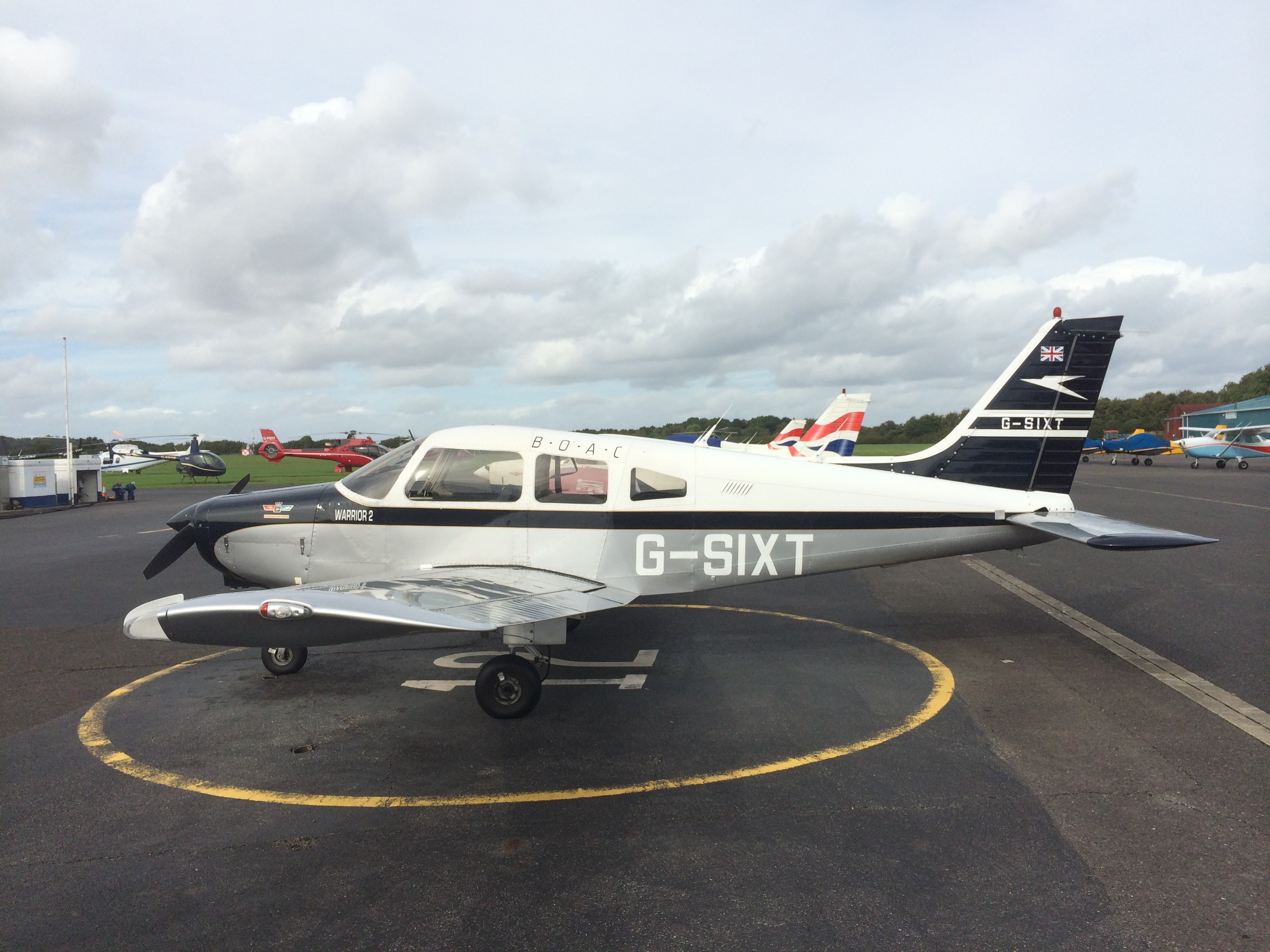
- IATA: HYC; ICAO: EGTB

Summary
- Airport type: Public
- Owner: Wycombe District Council
- Operator: Airways Aero Association Ltd
- Serves: High Wycombe and Marlow
- Location: High Wycombe, Buckinghamshire, England
- Elevation AMSL: 520 ft (160 m)
- Coordinates: 51°36′42″N 000°48′30″W
- Website: www.wycombeairpark.co.uk

Map
- Location in Buckinghamshire

Runways
Direction	Length		Surface
Direction	m	ft	Surface
06/24	735	2,411	Asphalt
06G/24G	610	2,001	Grass
35	695	2,280	Grass
- Sources: UK AIP at NATS

Wycombe Air Park, also known as Booker Airfield (IATA: HYC, ICAO: EGTB), is an operational general aviation aerodrome located in Booker, Buckinghamshire, 2.4 nautical miles (4.4 km; 2.8 mi) south-west of High Wycombe, England. The airfield celebrated its 50th year of opening on 25 April 2015. It originally opened in 1941 as RAF Booker and was primarily involved in training during World War II, remaining a military establishment until 1965.

Wycombe Air Park (Booker Airport) has a CAA Ordinary Licence (Number P523) that allows flights for the public transport of passengers or for flying instruction as authorised by the licensee (Airways Aero Associations Limited).

It has over 90,000 movements per annum, many of which are training circuits over the local area. The films Those Magnificent Men in their Flying Machines and Aces High were filmed here.

British European Aviation (majority owned by the Brown family) renewed its lease with WDC for 50 years with its group company AAA in 2014.

Since then over £500,000 has been invested in making the airfield a premier GA destination including hosting the Aero Expo and Elite London show.

== Use of the aerodrome ==
The lease on the aerodrome is held by Airways Aero Associations, who run Booker Aviation from the airfield. They provide air ground control services, aerodrome firefighting and various other services to the air park users as part of provision of a licensed airfield. The shareholding of AAA Ltd was sold in early 2014 to Heli Air.Also the air park is used by bookers gliding club and use the grass at the air park to do gliding there.

=== Fixed-base operators ===
Wycombe Air Park is home to a number of FBOs, providing flight training, aircraft maintenance and servicing, and pilot medical examination. The flight training organisation is Booker Aviation.

Heli Air Limited is the primary helicopter flight training school, charter operator, helicopter maintenance provider and Robinson Helicopter sales distributor, based on airfield.

Wycombe Air Park is also home to British European Aviation, the exclusive Piper Aircraft dealer for UK, Ireland, Channel Islands, Spain and Portugal.

Booker Gliding Club is an association for qualified glider pilots and for training glider pilots. It employs professional instructors and operates seven days a week operation throughout the season. During the COVID-19 pandemic it transferred its operations to Chiltern Park Aerodrome. It owns a fleet of gliders (Schleicher ASK 13, two Schleicher ASK 21, Schempp-Hirth Duo Discus, Slingsby T.21, SZD-51 Junior, Centrair Pegase, Schleicher ASW 19, Scheibe Falke) and three tow planes.

Engineering and avionics are provided by Airways Aero Associations Engineering, Air Training Services and Heli Air.

== Future of the aerodrome ==
The Air Park site is owned by Bucks County Council, who have leased it to AAA for aviation use until September 2066.

Bucks Council have recently taken about 50 acres of land back from the Air Park and are re-developing it for commercial use. Further, the Council have been granted planning for a re-configuration of the Air Park which could enable gliding to continue at Wycombe alongside the powered fixed-wing and heli operations. However, given that the leaseholders opposed the planning application, it is not clear how the changes will be implemented unless the Council buys out the lease.

== Regulation and environment ==
Wycombe Air Park has been subject to continuing complaints about noise and pollution from its activities, with continuing activity from various Parish Councils and residents associations requesting changes to repetitive circuit training flights in particular.

In 2010, the UK Department for Transport (DfT) came close to intervening to "specify" the Air Park under Section 5 of the Civil Aviation Act. This followed an application made to the Secretary of State for Transport in 2009. Wycombe District Council supported the request for the Section 5 order.

An earlier request for a section 5 order was made by Wycombe District Council in 1988, but was turned down in favour of an expert Inquiry to identify ways in which the air park could improve. The whole process including the decision not to specify and the subsequent inquiry ran from 1988 to 1990, and resulted in the O'Connor report in 1991.

== See also ==
- Airports of London - Wikipedia
