= London Parachute School =

Coordinates: 51°40′27″N 0°58′30″W

The London Parachute School is a BPA affiliated parachuting centre and skydiving drop zone at Chiltern Park Aerodrome at Ipsden, near Wallingford, Oxfordshire

The drop zone operates a Turbine Cessna 208B Grand Caravan. The centre provides student training in the Ram Air Progression System, Accelerated Freefall (AFF) and tandem skydiving.
