= Centrair 201 Marianne =

French two-seater training glider, 1985

201 Marianne
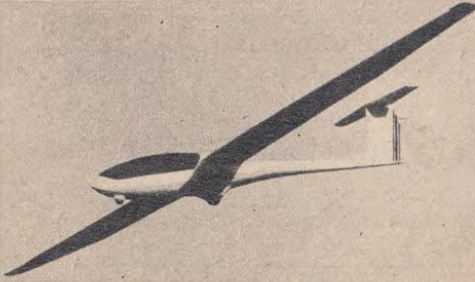

General information
- Type: Two seat glider for training and aerobatics
- National origin: France
- Manufacturer: Centrair
- Designer: Marc Ranjon
- Number built: 80

History
- First flight: 19 September 1985

The Centrair 201 Marianne is a training glider seating two in tandem, designed and built in France in the 1980s. It was intended to replace the numerous but ageing gliders equipping French gliding clubs; when Centrair ceased trading in 1988 some eighty Mariannes had been sold, fewer than hoped.

== Design and development ==
French government support for gliding was generous immediately after World War II but was fading by the 1980s. The Fédération Français de Vol à Voile (FFVV), who administered the French gliding movement, had to become self-financing and were central players in an effort to retain a viable gliding manufacturing base in France. By that time there was a need for a new two seat training glider to replace the existing club fleet of some 270 Wassmer Bijaves, so a competition was launched and won by Centrair. The Marianne design gained financial support from the Ministry of Transport and design support from Dassault Aviation and the Office Nationale d'Etude de Recherche Aerospatiale (ONERA).

The Marianne has a shoulder wing mounted with 3° of dihedral. It has a single spar formed from glassfibre rovings, around which the laminar flow wing profile and ailerons are made from polyvinyl chloride (PVC) foam and glass-reinforced plastic (GRP) sandwich. There are no flaps; double plate aluminium airbrakes extend only above the upper wing surface.

The fuselage is a monocoque pod and boom structure also built with composite sandwich layers, but with carbon fibre added. Its T-tail is constructed from GRP; the tailplane carries an elevator. There is no provision for water ballast. The two tandem seats have a common upper line but two single piece canopies, the forward one forward hinged and the rear opening to starboard. The undercarriage is fixed, with a main monowheel, fitted with a hydraulic brake, placed at the pod-boom transition within a prominent fairing and assisted by a smaller nosewheel.

The Marianne made its first flight on 19 September 1985 and received certification on 29 January 1987.

There were plans for later versions: an advanced trainer with flaps and retractable undercarriage; a higher performance Marianne with longer span (20.9 m; 68 ft 7 in); and a motorized, self launching version. None of these seem to have been built before Centrair ceased trading after producing eighty Mariannes.

== Operational history ==
The Marianne got mixed reviews at club level: its performance was good, perhaps somewhere between that of two of its best contemporaries, the Grob Twin Astir and the Schempp-Hirth Janus, the airbrakes worked well and its build quality and viceless handling were also praised. Criticism focussed on the rear seat, which was said to be uncomfortable with restricted views, and the difficult rigging and de-rigging procedures.

Sixty-five Mariannes appeared on the civil aircraft registers of mainland Europe in 2010. The September 2012 UK register lists two more. Another is in Australia in 2018, at Southern tableland Gliding Club.

== Variants ==
201
First two prototypes.
201A
One only on 2010 European registers, in Belgium.
201B
Standard production variant with at least 63 built.
201C
One only on 2010 European registers, in France.
2001
As identified by Jane's All the World's Aircraft 1987/88. (probably mis-identified)
2001M
A motor-glider version of the 2001 powered by a 45 kW (60 hp) Volkswagen JPX conversion.

== Specifications (2001) ==
Data from Jane's All the World's Aircraft 1987/88, Jane's All the World's Aircraft 1988–89

General characteristics

- Crew: 2
- Length: 9 m (29 ft 6 in)
- Wingspan: 18.55 m (60 ft 10 in)
- Height: 1.55 m (5 ft 1 in)
- Wing area: 17.185 m^{2} (184.98 sq ft)
- Aspect ratio: 19.9
- Airfoil: root: ONERA COAP1; tip:ONERA COAP2
- Empty weight: 430 kg (948 lb)
- Max takeoff weight: 650 kg (1,433 lb)

Performance

- Stall speed: 67 km/h (42 mph, 36 kn)
- Never exceed speed: 250 km/h (160 mph, 130 kn) in smooth air at max t/o weight

170 km/h (92 kn; 110 mph) in rough air
170 km/h (92 kn; 110 mph) on aero-tow
130 km/h (70 kn; 81 mph) on winch launch

- g limits: +4.3 -1.5
- Maximum glide ratio: 40 at 105 km/h (57 kn; 65 mph) at max t/o weight
- Rate of sink: 0.65 m/s (128 ft/min) at 85 km/h (46 kn; 53 mph) at max t/o weight
- Wing loading: 37.82 kg/m^{2} (7.75 lb/sq ft) max

== See also ==
Related lists

- List of gliders
