= Booker Gliding Centre =

Booker Gliding Club was formed in 1978 following the amalgamation of Thames Valley Gliding Club and Airways Flying Club. It is based at Wycombe Air Park. Trading as Booker Gliding Centre, it is a community amateur sports club and a member of the British Gliding Association.

The club flies on all suitable days of the year and launches from Wycombe Air Park using grass areas adjacent to the active runways. The club performs all launches by aerotow. Gliders and motor gliders using the airfield operate in the dead side of the powered circuit and must obey strict rules to avoid conflict with powered aircraft and helicopters.

== Current fleet ==
=== Gliders ===
- Schleicher ASK 13
- 2 x Schleicher ASK 21
- Centrair C101 Pegase
- Schleicher ASW 19
- Slingsby T.21
- Schempp-Hirth Duo Discus

=== Motor Glider ===
- SF-25E Super Falke

=== Tugs ===
- Robin DR300-180R
- Piper PA-25 Pawnee D
- Piper PA-18 "Super Cub" 180hp

=== Simulator ===
- The club has a gliding simulator based around the fuselage of a Schleicher ASK 13, which properly simulates force feedback and gives three monitors for enhanced field of view. This allows for training to commence in adverse weather.

== Activities ==
The club operates training for pilots of all abilities, running training courses and temporary memberships for those new to gliding. It also sells trial lessons for those wishing to try gliding without committing to a full course. Club members organise frequent expeditions to other gliding sites in the UK and abroad, and the club frequently hosts local and national competitions.
