= RAF Booker =

Former RAF base in Buckinghamshire, England

RAF Booker
- Near High Wycombe, Buckinghamshire in England

Site information
- Type: Royal Air Force station
- Owner: Air Ministry
- Operator: Royal Air Force
- Controlled by: RAF Flying Training Command

Location
- Location in Buckinghamshire RAF Booker (the United Kingdom)
- Coordinates: 51.617°N 0.804°W

Site history
- Built: 1940
- In use: 1941-1963
- Fate: Wycombe Air Park
- Battles/wars: European theatre of World War II

Airfield information
Runways
Direction	Length and surface
00/00	Grass

Royal Air Force Booker or more simply RAF Booker was a Royal Air Force station located 3 miles (5 km) southwest of High Wycombe, Buckinghamshire, England.

Booker was opened as a flying training school in 1941 on the site of a civilian flying school requisitioned and closed on the outbreak of war in 1939.

In 1965 the site was taken over by Airways Aero Associations (now the Airways Flying Club), who have operated the airfield as an increasingly commercial training and recreational field, now called Wycombe Air Park. Booker featured in many of the airfield scenes in the 1965 feature film Those Magnificent Men in their Flying Machines.

== History ==
RAF Booker was opened as the home of No. 21 Elementary Flying Training School RAF in 1941. The flying school operated 72 de Havilland Tiger Moths and Miles Magisters. No. 21 EFTS trained 120 pupils on a seven-week course - later to become 11 weeks.

In May 1942, training was also started on the airfield for the Glider Pilot Regiment.

In 1950, the University of London Air Squadron (ULAS) resumed flying out of Booker, and it also temporarily hosted the Manchester and Liverpool University Squadrons.

In 1955, a hard runway (made of 90 feet wide pierced steel planking) was added to the four wartime grass runways.

From 1956, part of the facilities, including a hangar, were used for accommodation and annual training of Air Training Corps staff of Warrant Officer rank. This week of training was an intense course in gaining a deeper understanding of duties and of the modern requirements of an ever-improving service.

During the Cold War the Director UKWMO was located at the United Kingdom Regional Air Operations Command (UK RAOC) at RAF Booker tasked with instigating the national four-minute air raid warnings.

The RAF continued to base its Bomber Command Communication Flight RAF at RAF Booker until 1963.

The following units were also here at some point:

- No. 1 Basic Flying Training School RAF (1950-53) using de Havilland Canada DHC-1 Chipmunk T.10s operated by Airwork Ltd
- Temporary dispersal for No. 5 Maintenance Unit RAF
- No. 126 Gliding School RAF between August 1943 and 1 September 1955
- Air Crew Allocation Unit between 28 February 1955 and 1 July 1958
- Home Command Modified Officer Cadet Training Unit from 1 June 1956
- Joint Services Staff College Flight between 15 January 1947 and 31 October 1952

== Current use ==
In 1965, the airfield became privately run, and is now Wycombe Air Park.

== See also ==
- List of former Royal Air Force stations
