= Booker, Buckinghamshire =

Suburb in High Wycombe, Buckinghamshire, England

Coordinates: 51.62°N 0.79°W

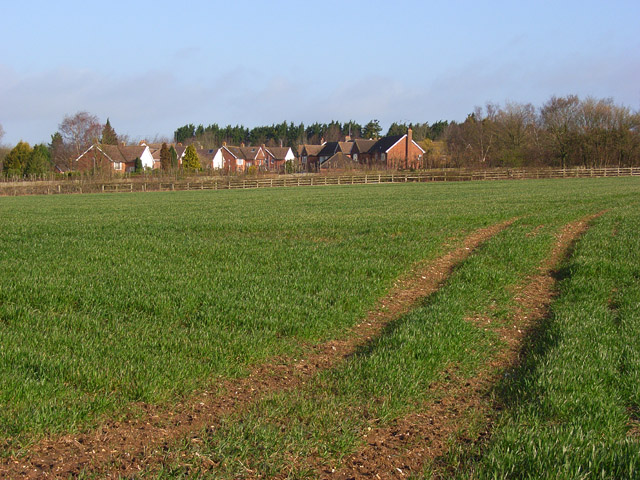
Farmland and houses in Booker

Booker was a hamlet within the parish of West Wycombe in Buckinghamshire, England, which has been absorbed into the expanding suburbs of High Wycombe. There are several housing areas in Booker, mainly modern estates. At the 2011 Census the hamlet was included in the High Wycombe Ward of Booker and Cressex.

Booker is also the name frequently given to the local airfield, more properly known as Wycombe Air Park, one of the busiest general aviation airfields in the South East of England. The airfield is used for general aviation and gliding and is home to both helicopters and fixed wing planes.

The Airways Flying Club and Wycombe Air Centre are based at the airfield.

Parts of Booker can be mistaken for Cressex, the village to the east. There are no clear borders between Booker, Cressex, Sands and Castlefield.

== History ==
The "tithing of Bokar" was referred to in the 13th-century. The etymology of the name is unknown, though it may come from "bōc-ora".
