= Heli Air =

British helicopter company

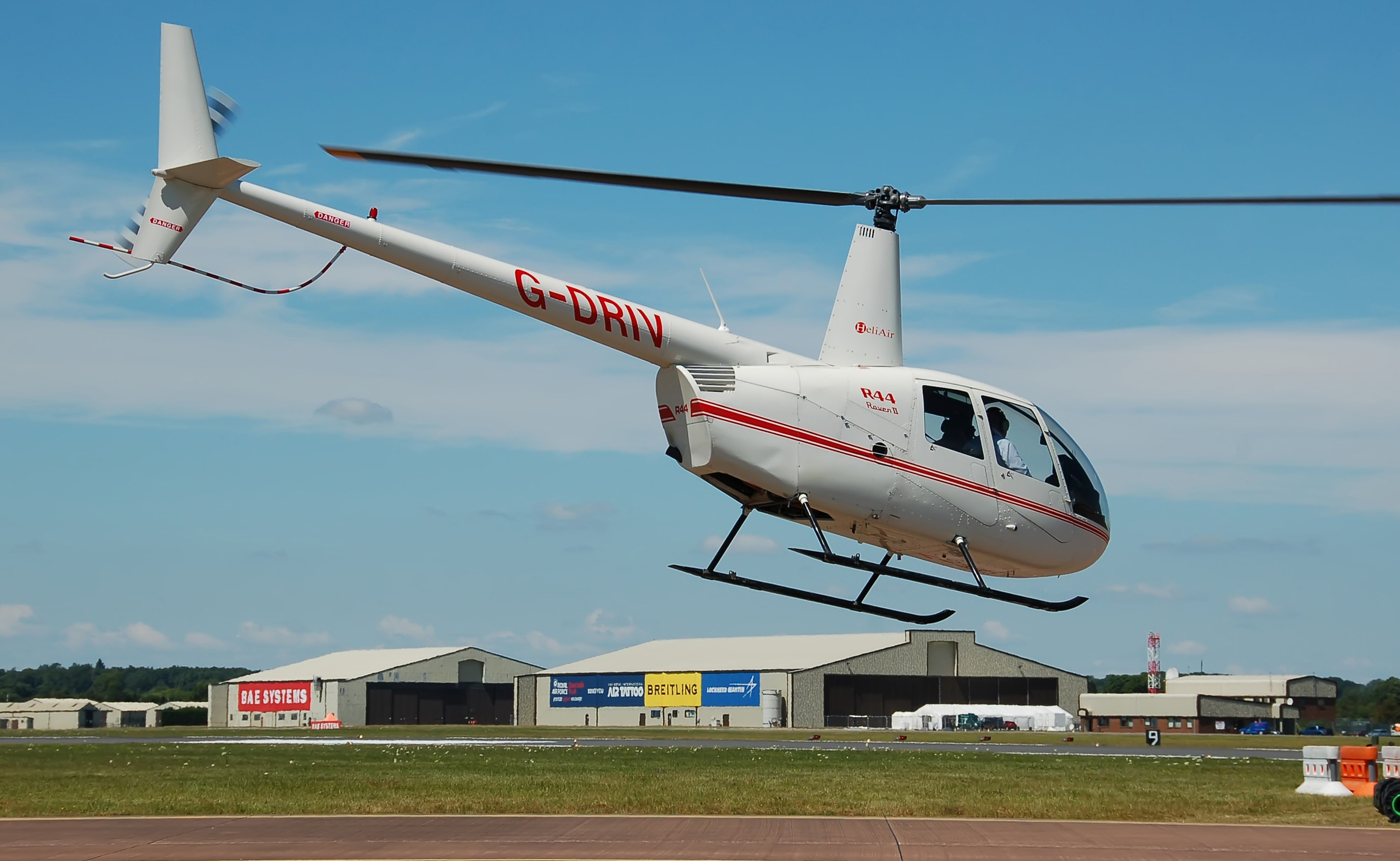
IATA	ICAO	Call sign
—	—	WHISPER
- Founded: 17 June 1986; Wellesbourne, Warwickshire, England
- Operating bases: Cumbernauld Airport; Gloucestershire Airport; Wycombe Air Park; Wellesbourne Mountford Airfield
- Fleet size: 11
- Parent company: British European Aviation Ltd
- Headquarters: Wellesbourne, Warwickshire, England.
- Website: www.heliair.com

Heli Air is a British light helicopter company and a distributor of Robinson helicopters. The company slogan is Helicopters Nationwide.

== Services ==
The company provides:

- Helicopter Training and Helicopter selection
- Helicopter Purchase assistance
- Basic Helicopter Training
- Advanced Helicopter Training
- Helicopter Management

== Operating bases ==
Heli Air currently operates from 2 bases nationwide; Wycombe, and Wellesbourne.

Cumbernauld is operated by Heli Air Scotland Limited, a Scottish registered company.

In 2016 Heli Air operated 9 bases at one time. Bases now closed; Cumbernauld, Gloucester, Silverstone, Denham, Fairoaks, Manchester, Thruxton.
