= Surinder Arora =

English businessman

- Born: September 1958 (age 67); Punjab, India
- Occupation: Hotel owner
- Spouse: Sunita Arora
- Children: 3

Surinder Arora (born September 1958) is a British-Indian billionaire businessman in the hotel sector. He concentrates on hotels near airports, making a specialty of providing rooms for aircrew, and has close links with British Airways and a strong personal interest in aviation.

== Early life ==
Arora was born in September 1958 in the Indian state of Punjab to parents who had been displaced from the India/Pakistan border town of Fazilka and were about to emigrate to the United Kingdom. Arora was left with an aunt and uncle whom he believed to be his parents until he re-joined his real parents in the UK at the age of thirteen.

In 1988, Arora became a salesman for the Abbey Life insurance company, becoming a sales manager and achieving a rating as the company's second-best salesman after one year.

== Career ==
In 1993, Arora left Abbey Life to develop a "B&B" (bed and breakfast) to serve airline staff at Heathrow Airport. The hotel that replaced the B&B won a contract from British Airways in 1999.

In 2004 Arora won the franchise for the Accor Sofitel brand and bought the 500-bedroom Le Meridien London Gatwick hotel to rebrand as the Sofitel London Gatwick. Sofitel London Heathrow, a £180m 600-bedroom sister hotel was announced the same year. Today Arora owns hotels that provide a total of over 5,500 bedrooms including franchises from Hilton and Holiday Inn.

In September 2021, the Home Secretary, Priti Patel was accused of breaking the Ministerial Code when it was revealed that she had brokered a lobbying deal in a secret meeting with Arora and the head of BA.

Arora refers to members of his business as "like family". Turnover of staff, especially maids, is much lower than the high hotel industry average.

== Net worth ==
In 2009, he was ranked at 388 in The Times list of the richest people in the UK with a net worth of £140 million. In 2013, The Sunday Times Rich List (STRL) estimated his worth to be £356 million. In May 2019, following a revaluation of his hotels, the Evening Standard estimated his net worth at £1.129 billion.

== Politics and public life ==
Arora was a public supporter of the Labour Party under Tony Blair, though he opposed the 2003 Iraq War. He is a member of the New Enterprise Council, a group of entrepreneurs that advises the Conservative Party on business policy. He is also a member of the London Skills And Employment Board, and deputy chairman of Wentworth Golf Club.

== Personal life ==
Arora is married to Sunita Arora with three children, and lives in Wentworth, UK.
