= SA Centrair =

Centrair was a French glider manufacturer that was founded by Marc Ranjon and his wife Genevieve in 1970. It started as the agent for glider manufacturer Alexander Schleicher GmbH & Co, but it manufactured Schleicher's ASW 20 under licence from 1977. Later, Centrair also manufactured the Scheibe SF 34 as the Centrair SNC-34 Alliance.

Ranjon decided to build a new Standard Class sailplane with a wing thinner than the ASW 19 using the ASW 20 fuselage. The result was the C101 Pegase which first flew in 1981. Schleichers were not happy that their agent was in competition with them using their fuselage design, but the dispute was settled. Three hundred Pegases were made before production stopped in 1988. They were never competitive with the best in the Standard Class, but are popular "club" aircraft, being easy to handle.

In 1980, Centrair conducted design work on a six-seat, powered, business aircraft with a pusher propeller behind the tail. This work was conducted in collaboration with Dassault and a number of technical schools.

In the 1980s the French gliding authorities were anxious that there should be an indigenous two-seater to replace the 250 ageing trainers in France. The C201 Marianne was the result, flying in 1985. Eighty were built before the Centrair Company dissolved.
