= Centrair Pegase =

French single seat glider

C101 Pegase
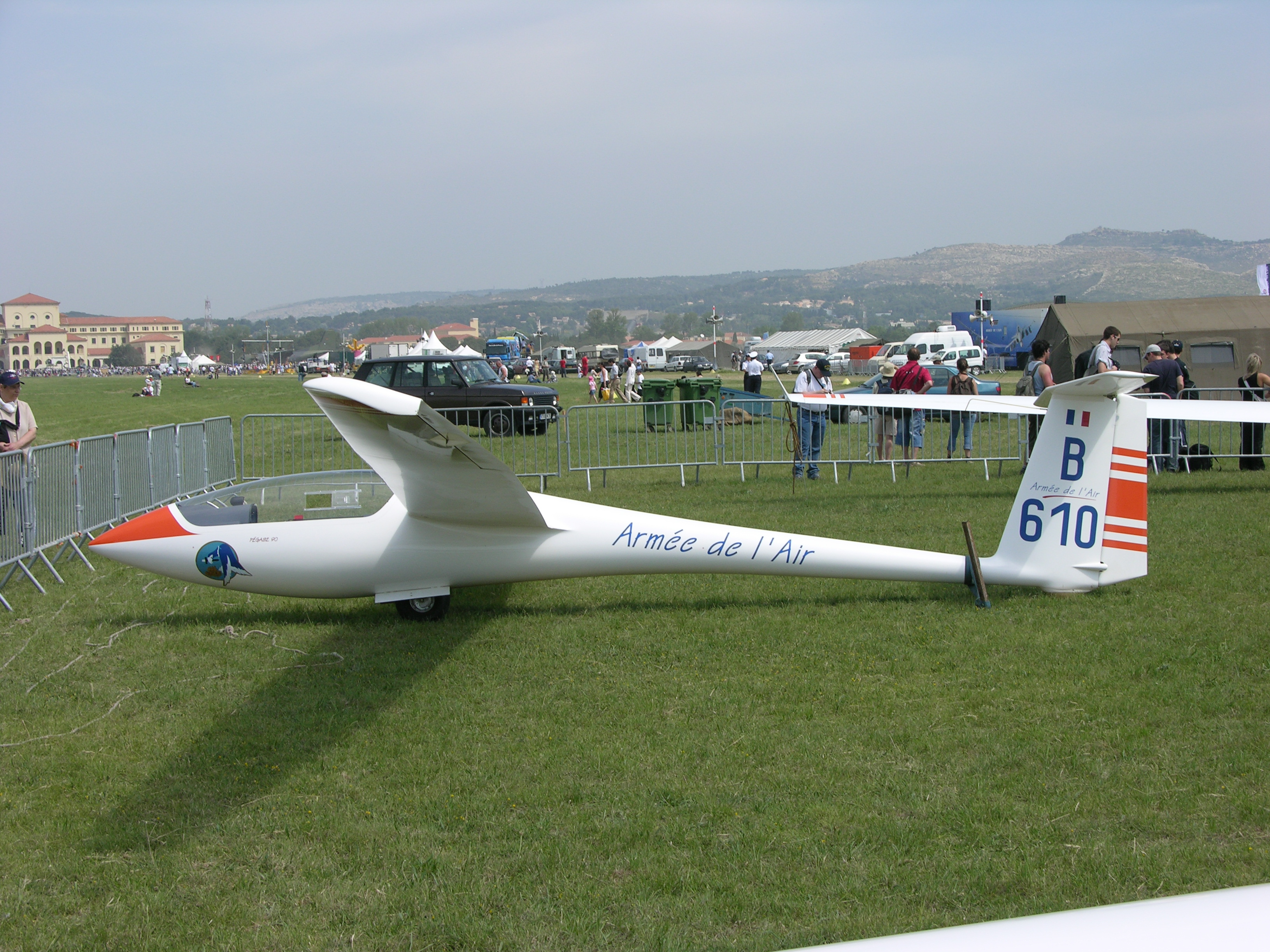

General information
- Type: Standard Class sailplane
- Manufacturer: Centrair
- Designer: Marc Ranjon
- Number built: ~700

The Centrair C101 Pegase is a Standard Class single-seat glider manufactured by Centrair starting in 1981. The design uses the ASW 19 fuselage with a new wing designed by ONERA, giving better performance than the German original.

Models manufactured since 1990 as the Pegase 90 are equipped with a different cockpit interior: Shorter handles, smaller instrument panel and minor structural changes. The major difference between the Pegase 90 and previous models was the introduction of flight controls that automatically connect during rigging.

The aircraft structure is composed of laminated fibreglass and epoxy resin. The wing has a laminar flow airfoil with top surface air brakes.

== Variants ==
Centrair 101 Pegase
Prototype Pegase with ASW19-derived fuselage with all-new wings.
C101
Fitted with fixed landing gear
C101A
Fitted with retractable landing gear
C101P
Fitted with fixed landing gear and fittings for optional winglets
C101AP
Fitted with retractable landing gear and fittings for optional winglets
C101B
Fitted with CFRP main spar allowing additional water ballast to be carried
C101D
Altered wing shape, increasing performance
C101BC
Altered wing shape and CFRP main spar

== Specifications (Pégase D) ==
Data from

General characteristics

- Crew: 1
- Length: 7 m (23 ft 0 in)
- Wingspan: 15 m (49 ft 3 in)
- Height: 1.38 m (4 ft 6 in)
- Wing area: 10.5 m^{2} (113 sq ft)
- Aspect ratio: 21.43
- Airfoil: root: ONERA COAP1; tip:ONERA COAP2
- Empty weight: 252 kg (556 lb)
- Max takeoff weight: 505 kg (1,113 lb)

Performance

- Never exceed speed: 250 km/h (160 mph, 130 kn) in smooth air at max t/o weight
  - 170 km/h (92 kn; 110 mph) in rough air (Serial Nos 101001 to 101039plus 101041, which have not had Centrair Major Mod 101-02, ( DGAC AD 93-145(A)) incorporated, have Vra, decreased to 163 km/h / 88 knots.)
  - 170 km/h (92 kn; 110 mph) on aero-tow
  - 120 km/h (65 kn; 75 mph) on winch launch
- Maximum glide ratio: 42.5 at 105 km/h (57 kn; 65 mph) at max t/o weight
- Rate of sink: 0.62 m/s (122 ft/min) at 85 km/h (46 kn; 53 mph) at max t/o weight
- Wing loading: 48.1 kg/m^{2} (9.9 lb/sq ft) max

== See also ==
Related lists

- List of gliders
